= Claus Vogdt =

Governor of Tranquebar from 1694 to 1701

14th Governor of Tranquebar
- In office 1694 – 19 May 1701
- Monarchs: Christian V Frederick IV
- Preceded by: Christian Porck
- Succeeded by: Andreas Andræ

Personal details
- Born: Unknown Denmark–Norway
- Died: 1701 Tranquebar, Danish India
- Spouse: Ulrica Anthoinette

Military service
- Allegiance: Denmark–Norway
- Years of service: c. 1669–1701
- Battles/wars: Dano-Mughal War; Siege of Tranquebar (1699)

Claus Vogdt (Note: Danish pronunciation: [ˈkʰlɑwˀs ˈvʌkt]) (alternatively spelled Voigt and Vogt; d. 19 May 1701) was a Danish merchant and governor of Tranquebar from 1694 to his death in 1701.

Vogdt came to Tranquebar in 1669 as a merchant, but became governor upon the death of Governor Christian Porck. During his governance, Vogdt oversaw the consecration of the first Lutheran church in India, the establishment of peace with the Mughal Empire, and the defence of Tranquebar during its siege in 1699.

== Career ==
Claus Vogdt was installed as a lower merchant (underkøbmand) by the Danish East India Company on the frigate Færøe in the late 1690s and arrived on 31 May 1669 at the Danish colony of Tranquebar. He was subsequently installed at Fort Dansborg with the same mercantile function. Vogdt's position eventually advanced to chief merchant (overkøbmand) and became the Interim Governor of Tranquebar at the death of Governor Christian Porck in 1694. His position as governor was officially confirmed by a royal decree on 2 October 1695.

=== Mughal negotiations ===
In January 1695, Vogdt sent secretary Andreas Andræ to the Malabar Coast to encourage the newly established trade in that region. Consequently, the Danes established a pepper clearing house in Oddeway Torre (Danish corruption of Edava) near Varkala. After Andræ's return in May, Vogdt sent him to Malacca, Aceh, and later in 1698 to Bengal, accompanied by Thomas Schmertz. Here, Andræ negotiated the Dano-Mughal Treaty with the Mughal Empire, which reestablished Danish trading rights, made both parties renounce war reparations, and ceded Dannemarksnagore to Danish India. In the same year, on 29 October, King Christian V of Denmark issued a new charter for a period of 40 years for the D. E. I. C., which was confirmed by Christian V's successor, Frederick IV, the following year. The charter was nearly identical to the 1670 charter, but gave the company the authority to appoint the Commander of Dansborg.

=== Siege of Tranquebar ===
Still, in 1698, Vogdt became involved in a conflict with Thanjavur, where Tranquebar was besieged, and a part of the Danish district was severely plundered. Despite defending the siege with English help, the D.E.I.C. suffered notable losses. However, Vogdt had, in 1696, improved and expanded the city wall, and the siege was subsequently futile. The improved fortifications and Vogdt's mildness attracted numerous migrants from Thanjavur. Additionally, Vogdt participated in the local slave trade and allowed the company to make voyages to Achin, Sumatra. Altogether, the company got 217,747 Danish rigsdaler from 1688 to 1697 from slavery.

According to a poem, the Zion Church in Tranquebar, which was the first Lutheran church in India, was consecrated during Vogdt's tenure.

Vogdt died suddenly on 19 May 1701 and was succeeded by his secretary, Andreas Andræ.

== Personal life ==
Claus Vogdt was married to Ulrica Anthoinette, who died in 1699 in Tranquebar. The marriage was childless. Following his death, a commission was established to determine how much damage Vogdt had caused Tranquebar when he arbitrarily involved the colony in the siege of 1699.

== See also ==
- Anders Nielsen (colonist) – 16th-century Danish merchant and colonist
- Bartholomäus Ziegenbalg – German Lutheran clergy (1682–1719)

== Notes and references ==
=== Works cited ===
- Larsen, Kay (1940). Guvernører, Residenter, Kommandanter og Chefer (PDF) (in Danish). Copenhagen: Arthur Jensens Forlag.
- Bastrup, C. (1919). Danmarks Søfart og Søhandel [Danish Shipping and Maritime Trade] (PDF) (in Danish). Copenhagen: Nyt Nordisk Forlag.
- Díaz, Jorge Simón Izquierdo (2019). The Trade in Domestic Servants (Morianer) from Tranquebar for Upper Class Danish Homes in the First Half of the Seventeenth Century (PDF). Cambridge University Press. p. 199. Archived from the original on 2020-05-05.
- Diller, Stephan (1999). Die Dänen in Indien, Südostasien und China (1620-1845) (in German). Otto Harrassowitz Verlag. p. 184. ISBN 978-3-447-04123-2.
- Wellen, Kathryn (2015). The Danish East India Company's War against the Mughal Empire, 1642-1698 (PDF). Royal Netherlands Institute for Southeast Asian and Caribbean Studies.
- Gross, Andreas (2006). Halle and the Beginning of Protestant Christianity in India (PDF). Halle: Publishing House of the Francke Foundations in Halle. p. 238.
- Snodgrass, Mary (2012). World Food. Taylor & Francis.
