= Andreas Andræ =

Danish surgeon and colonial administrator (died 1701)

15th Governor of Tranquebar
- In office 1701
- Monarch: Frederick IV
- Preceded by: Claus Vogdt
- Succeeded by: Mikkel Knudsen Crone

1st Governor of Dannemarksnagore
- In office 1698 – January 1699
- Monarchs: Christian V Frederick IV
- Preceded by: Office established
- Succeeded by: Thomas Schmertz

Personal details
- Born: Unknown Denmark–Norway
- Died: 1701 Tranquebar, Danish India

Andreas Andræ (Note: Danish pronunciation: [ænˈtʁe:æs ænˈtʁɛ:]) (alternatively spelled Andrae and Andreæ; died 1701) was a Danish surgeon and colonial administrator who established the Danish colony of Dannemarksnagore in 1698.

Andræ came to the Danish colony of Tranquebar in c. 1691 and was a surgeon until 1695, when he became head of a Danish squadron to the Malabar Coast. In 1698, Andræ was sent to Bengal, negotiating the Dano-Mughal Treaty, which ended the Dano-Mughal War and leased Dannemarksnagore to Danish India, where he served as governor from 1698 to 1699.

He became the governor of Tranquebar in 1701 after Claus Vogdt's death, managing to finish the construction of the Zion Church before dying a few months later.

== Career ==
Andreas Andræ came to the Danish colony of Tranquebar in c. 1691 as overmester (surgeon on a ship) in the Danish East India Company's service. He soon proved himself useful in both mercantile and diplomatic regards and was quickly promoted to mester (highest-ranking surgeon) in March 1691 and chief surgeon (obberchirurg) on 6 April the same year. In 1692, he became head of the hospital in Tranquebar, and in 1694, he became a third-in-command of the colony's Privy Council (secrete råd).

=== Voyage to the Malabar Coast ===
Andræ is described as intelligent, enterprising, energetic, and knowledgeable, being highly cultivated in many capacities, while showing great administrative and commercial abilities. Consequently, in January 1695, he was chosen by the governor of Tranquebar, Claus Vogdt, as chief of an expedition consisting of the ship Dansborg, the shallop Quintus, and three other vessels. Followingly, the Danish squadron was sent to the Malabar Coast to bolster Danish trade in the region, to which Andræ achieved good results, establishing a pepper clearing house in Oddeway Torre. Andræ departed again on 6 April with Dansborg and Quintus, returning to Tranquebar on 1 May the same year.

=== Time in Bengal ===
At the end of 1698, Andræ, accompanied by Thomas Schmertz, was sent to Bengal to negotiate with the Mughal Empire, which had been at war with Danish India since 1642. Here, Andræ managed to conclude a treaty with the Subahdar of Bengal, Azim-ush-Shan, after which both sides renounced their demands for previously seized ships, and the D.E.I.C. got its previous trading privileges restored. Andræ also made a gift to Azim-ush-Shan in the form of 15,000 rupees and four cannons.

Furthermore, Andræ negotiated a firman which would lease a piece of land at the Hooghly River in Gondelapore to the Danes for 30,000 rupees to be paid over a 10-year period. Here, the Danes established a factory, which became known as Dannemarksnagore, and was supplied by salesmen, guards, and goods. The factory was provisionally a local Indian house, although a big fort with stone walls was erected the following year. Andræ left Dannemarksnagore on the vessel Christianus Quintus in January 1699 after 5 months in Bengal, leaving Thomas Schmertz as overhoved of the colony.

=== Governor of Tranquebar ===
Upon returning to Tranquebar during the spring, Andræ became sekonde (second-in-command) of the Privy Council and was installed as interim governor of Tranquebar on 25 June 1701, following Claus Vogdt's death, with a yearly salary of 800 Danish rigsdaler. However, Andræ died a few months later and was succeeded by Mikkel Knudsen Crone. Despite his short term, Andræ still subsidized and finished the construction of the Zion Church in 1701, which was initiated by Governor Vogdt.

== Personal life ==
=== Possible estate ===
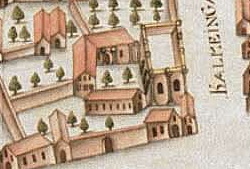
Map of Tranquebar by Gregers Daa Trellund, depicting Andreas Andræ's estate during the 1690s

On a map by Gregers Daa Trellund depicting Tranquebar in the 1690s, there is a newly built estate attributed to a "Mester Andreasis," which likely refers to Andræ. The estate was possibly funded by money earned during Andræ's time in Bengal.

=== White horse ===
While also being in Bengal, Andræ was gifted a white riding horse (ganger) by Azim-ush-Shan, as he was so impressed by Andræ. Andræ eventually transported it safely to Tranquebar, where it was presented on Fort Dansborg. Here, the horse lived when Andræ became the interim governor. Following Andræ's death, the horse passed over to Mikkel Knudsen Crone and later to Governor Jørgen Bjørn.

Andræ had a wife and children, including a married daughter, all of whom returned to Denmark on the vessel Cronprintzen af Danmark after his death.

== See also ==
- Jørgen Bjørn – Governor of Tranquebar from 1702 to 1704
- Wolf Henrik von Kalnein – Danish officer and colonial administrator (died 1690)
- Sivert Adeler – Danish captain and colonial administrator (1647–1683)

== Notes and citations ==
=== References ===
- Faarborg, Birte (1971). "Trellunds Trankebarkort 1733" [Trellund's Map of Tranquebar 1733] (PDF). Tidsskrift for Arkivforskning (in Danish). 3 (3). Danish National Archives – via Danskernes Historie Online.
- Kryger, Karin (2006). "The Churches of Tranquebar in the Danish Period 1620-1845". In Gross, Andreas; Kumaradoss, Yesurajamony; Liebau, Heike (eds.). Halle and the Beginning of Protestant Christianity in India. Vol. 1–3. Halle, Germany: Francke Foundations. p. 238. ISBN 3-931479-84-6.
- Larsen, Kay (1907). De dansk-ostindiske koloniers historie – Trankebar [History of the Danish East Indian Colonies – Tranquebar] (in Danish). Vol. 1. Copenhagen, Denmark: Centralforlaget – via Danskernes Historie Online.
- Larsen, Kay (1908). De dansk-ostindiske koloniers historie – De Bengalske loger & Nikobarerne [History of the Danish East Indian Colonies – The Bengali Lodges & the Nicobar Islands] (in Danish). Vol. 2. Copenhagen, Denmark: Centralforlaget – via Danskernes Historie Online.
- Larsen, Kay (1940a). Guvernører, residenter, kommandanter og chefer [Governors, Residents, Commanders and Chiefs] (PDF) (in Danish). Copenhagen, Denmark: Arthur Jensens Forlag – via Danskernes Historie Online.
- Larsen, Kay (1 July 1940b). Bærentzen, Axel (ed.). "De Danskes hvide 'Presentheste'" [The Danes White "Present Horses"] (PDF). Vikingen [The Viking] (in Danish). Vol. 17, no. 13 – via Marinehistorisk Selskab og Orlogsmuseets Venner.
- Snodgrass, Mary Ellen (15 September 2012). "Danish East India Company". World Food. Armonk, New York: M. E. Sharpe. ISBN 978-0-7656-8278-9. LCCN 2012014375.
- Wellen, Kathryn (2015). "The Danish East India Company's War against the Mughal Empire, 1642-1698" (PDF). Journal of Early Modern History. 19 (5). Leiden, the Netherlands: Brill Publishers: 439–461. doi:10.1163/15700658-12342470. eISSN 1568-5209. ISSN 0022-4995.
