= Thomas Schmertz =

Governor of Dannemarksnagore from 1699 to 1702

2nd Governor of Dannemarksnagore
- In office January 1699 – 26 July 1702
- Monarch: Frederick IV
- Preceded by: Andreas Andræ
- Succeeded by: Johan Joachim Michelsen

Personal details
- Born: Unknown Denmark–Norway
- Died: c. October 1708 Tranquebar, Danish India
- Spouse: Elisabeth Søfrensen
- Children: 1

Thomas Schmertz (Note: Danish pronunciation: [ˈtsʰʌmæs ˈʃmɛɐ̯ts]) (died c. October 1708) was a Danish colonial official and governor of Dannemarksnagore from January 1699 to 26 July 1702.

Schmertz started as a trading assistant of the Danish East India Company in the Danish colony of Tranquebar. In 1698, he was sent to Bengal together with Andreas Andræ, negotiating the Dano-Mughal Treaty, which ended the Dano-Mughal War, and leased Dannemarksnagore to Danish India. Here, he served as governor from 1699 until he was recalled to Tranquebar in 1702 on the basis of fraud and misconduct. Consequently, Schmertz was repatriated to Denmark–Norway in 1703, but returned to Tranquebar in 1706.

Schmertz died before October 1708 in Tranquebar.

== Career ==
Thomas Schmertz began his career in the Danish East India Company as a trading assistant in the Danish colony of Tranquebar.

=== Time in Bengal ===
At the end of 1698, Schmertz, accompanied by Andreas Andræ, was sent to Bengal to negotiate with the Mughal Empire, which had been at war with Danish India since 1642. Here, Schmertz contributed to the conclusion of a treaty, establishing the Danish factory of Dannemarksnagore at the Hooghly River in Gondalpara. The factory was provisionally a local house, although a big fort with stone walls was erected the following year. When Andræ left Dannemarksnagore in January 1699, Schmertz became the opperhoved of the colony. At that time, the colony was only guarded by 30 Indian soldiers, while a couple of both large and small vessels regularly supplied the colony with money, goods, and human resources from Tranquebar. As such, Fortuna got a permanent base there, with Schmertz planning to acquire even more ships. During 1700, more warehouses and a tall curtain wall were erected in the colony, while the number of Danish officials increased. Despite this, the colony was still not properly settled in 1702. Concurrently, the colony had few resources, which were badly distributed among the Danish officials. Additionally, different misconducts and irregularities occurred in the colony, which made Indian historian Lalit Mohan Mitra refer to Schmertz as incompetent, saying he did little to further Danish trade.

=== Recalled to Tranquebar ===
Consequently, Schmertz and 2 other assistants were recalled to Tranquebar in 1702 by the colony's Privy Council (secrete råd). Schmertz was accused of fraud and misconduct, and on 26 July 1702, he resigned as governor of Dannemarksnagore in favor of Johan Joachim Michelsen, being deemed responsible for fraudulently using a large amount of money in the colony; however, no evidence of this was found.

Consequently, Schmertz was repatriated to Denmark–Norway in 1703, but returned to Tranquebar in 1706. However, he was disallowed from serving in the D.E.I.C. and subsequently went to Bengal on board the yacht Gyldenløve to gather his receivables.

Schmertz died before October 1708.

== Personal life ==
Schmertz was married to Elisabeth Søfrensen, who lived by selling beverages in Tranquebar while Schmertz was in Bengal, continuing this after Schmertz's death in 1708. Together, they had a girl, who was married to the priest of the Zion Church, Jacob Clementin. Furthermore, Schmertz had a servant, Ramma, who was caught stealing cheroots in 1695, to which Schmertz was summoned before Tranquebar's council and courthouse (raad og justitshus) on 17 January the same year.

== See also ==
- Axel Juel – Danish captain and colonial administrator (1655–1720)
- Jørgen Bjørn – Governor of Tranquebar from 1702 to 1704
- Mikkel Knudsen Crone – Governor of Saint Thomas from 1709 to 1716

== Notes and citations ==
=== References ===
- Aslanian, Sebouh David; Subrahmanyam, Sanjay (7 April 2025). "Uneasy Partnership". Journal of the Economic and Social History of the Orient. 68. Brill Publishers. doi:10.1163/15685209-12341647. eISSN 1568-5209. ISSN 0022-4995.
- Larsen, Kay (1908). De dansk-ostindiske koloniers historie – De Bengalske loger & Nikobarerne [History of the Danish East Indian Colonies – The Bengali Lodges & the Nicobar Islands] (in Danish). Vol. 2. Copenhagen, Denmark: Centralforlaget – via Danskernes Historie Online.
- Larsen, Kay (1940). Guvernører, residenter, kommandanter og chefer [Governors, Residents, Commanders and Chiefs] (PDF) (in Danish). Copenhagen, Denmark: Arthur Jensens Forlag – via Danskernes Historie Online.
- Mitra, Lalit Mohan (September 1952). The Danes in Bengal (PDF) (1st ed.). Kolkata, India: Prabartak Publishers – via Internet Archive.
