= Mikkel Knudsen Crone =

Governor of Saint Thomas from 1709 to 1716

17th Governor of Saint Thomas
- In office 27 March 1710 – 8 August 1716
- Monarch: Frederick IV
- Preceded by: Diderich Mogensen
- Succeeded by: Erik Bredal

16th Governor of Tranquebar
- In office 1701–1702
- Monarch: Frederick IV
- Preceded by: Andreas Andræ
- Succeeded by: Jørgen Bjørn

Personal details
- Born: Unknown Denmark–Norway
- Died: 8 August 1716 Saint Thomas, Danish West Indies
- Resting place: Frederick Lutheran Church (present-day Charlotte Amalie, U.S. Virgin Islands)
- Spouse: Johanne Tenete Blare (m. 1714)

Mikkel Knudsen Crone (Note: Danish pronunciation: [ˈme̝kl̩ ˈkʰnusn̩ ˈkʰʁo:nə]) (alternatively spelled Michel and Michael; died 8 August 1716) was a Danish governor of Saint Thomas from 27 March 1710 to his death in 1716 and governor of Tranquebar from 1701 to 1702.

Crone was first mentioned in 1695 as an assistant in the Danish colony of Tranquebar, but quickly advanced and became Interim Governor of Tranquebar at the death of Governor Andreas Andræ in 1701. He was degraded upon the arrival of Governor Jørgen Bjørn in 1702 and returned to Denmark–Norway in 1705.

In 1709, Crone was appointed as the governor of Danish Saint Thomas by the Danish West India–Guinea Company. During his tenure, he implemented economic nationalistic policies at the expense of the planter class, which caused them to protest and send a delegation to Copenhagen. Here, the conflict was considered by King Frederick IV and Kommercekollegiet, who ruled in favor of the planters. Additionally, it was revealed that Crone had been conducting trade illegally, and an investigation was launched.

Crone died on 8 August 1716 on Saint Thomas before he could be judged and was buried at Frederick Lutheran Church in Charlotte Amalie.

== Career in India ==
Mikkel Knudsen Crone is first mentioned in 1695 as an assistant in the Danish colony of Tranquebar, but quickly advanced to subaccountant (underbogholder) and became a member of the privy council (secrete råd) on 26 July 1697. In 1699, he became chief accountant and third-in-command of the privy council, and on 25 July 1701, he became chief merchant and sekonde (second-in-command) of the privy council. Later in 1701, he became the Interim Governor of Tranquebar at the death of Governor Andreas Andræ. As governor, Crone calculated the damages caused by the siege of Tranquebar in 1699, which was submitted to the Danish East India Company's management.

According to Danish colonial historian Kay Larsen, Crone was incompetent, without energy, and ignored his duties. Similarly, a scholarly work by Caspar Christiansen mentions Crone's tenure as "less fortunetously noticed."

Consequently, upon the arrival of the new governor, Jørgen Bjørn, in July 1702, Crone was degraded to third-in-command of the privy council and forbidden to serve as interim governor. However, he resumed the title of chief merchant and appeared to assume the interim governorship at Jørgen Bjørn's death in 1704. Following the arrival of the new governor, Johan Sigismund Hassius, Crone was given a lower merchant (underkøbmand) post, which caused him to resign and initiate his return to Denmark. Subsequently, Crone requested permission to repatriate on 19 August 1704 with his wife and an infant child. This was granted the same day, and Crone left Tranquebar on 22 October with 1,000 Danish rigsdaler, returning to Denmark in 1705.

== Governor of Saint Thomas ==
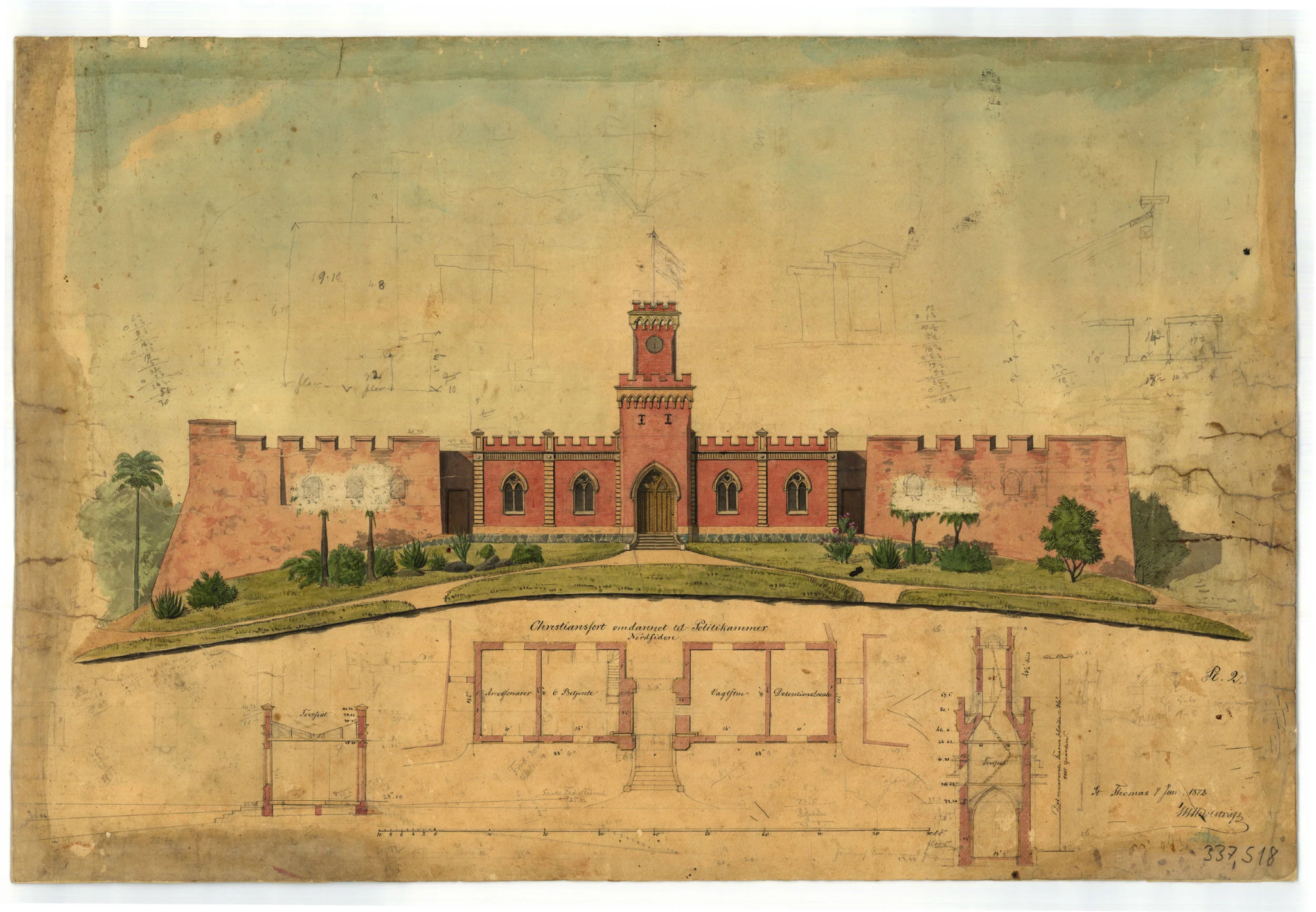
Architectural drawing of Fort Christian, Charlotte Amalie, by William A. Thulstrup in 1872

In Copenhagen, in 1709, Crone was appointed as opperhoved (governor) of the Danish colony of Saint Thomas by the Danish West India–Guinea Company with royal permission. Despite his past in the D.E.I.C., the D.W.I.G.C. management felt it important to choose a governor with mercantile experience, but without any association with Saint Thomas' inhabitants. Along with officials, soldiers, and goods, Crone departed from Copenhagen on 19 January 1710 on the frigate Christiansfort with an East Indiaman following. On 25 March, Christiansfort reached its namesake, Christiansfort (Fort Christian) on Saint Thomas. In the following days, Interim Governor Didrich Mogensen prepared the fort for Crone's arrival, and on 27 March, Crone entered the fort and assumed the governorship, receiving the titles of vice commander, opperhoved, and governor.

=== Privateering ===
Already, on 3 April, Crone introduced a decree that demanded Danish vessels have a sea passport (sø-pas) for every voyage sailing outside Saint Thomas, Saint John, and Crab Island to stop the practice of sailing under a foreign flag. Still, privateers sometimes tried to capture some of the island's own vessels. This had hitherto been countered by two civil captains (borgerkaptajner), whose duty was to protect the island's interests and warn it in the case of encountering privateers. However, this was not sufficient, and Crone therefore created a naval task force consisting of six soldiers and 14 colonists led by Lieutenant Johan Seis. Despite the small number, the Danish officer and the redcoated people acted more authoritatively and effectively. Additionally, privateers had to prove their identity at the harbor, and their prizes had to be approved before they could be brought for sale at Saint Thomas.

=== Plans to colonize Saint John ===
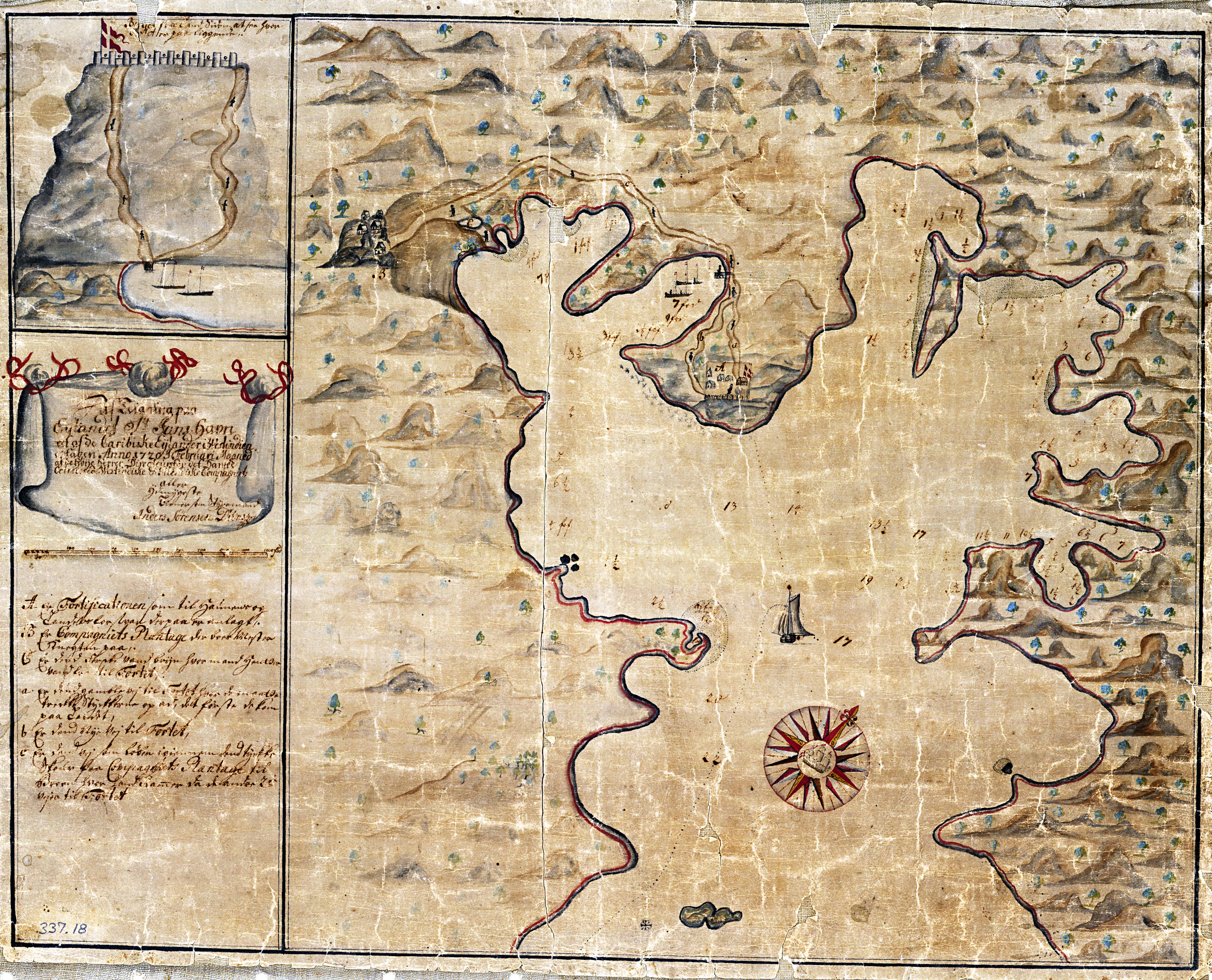
1720 Map of the Coral Bay on Saint John, by Anders Sørensen Duus

In 1715, there were signs that the soil was depleting on Saint Thomas, and many planters therefore wished to cultivate the nearby island of Saint John. Crone appears to have revived the plan of a colonization of Saint John in early 1715, when he wrote to the D.W.I.G.C. that before he resigned, he would:

View Crab Island and Saint John and immediately give a complete report of their situation, as this island [Saint Thomas] becomes meager and worse every day. Furthermore, it is a shame to let such islands lie deserted since, as far as I can ascertain, they could yield great profits, [and I] presume that the noble gentlemen will find my proposition founded on such ground that they will have these islands populated and inhabited.

— Mikkel Knudsen Crone

In this regard, Crone reported in July that a group of planters, with Johan Heinrich Sieben at the forefront, initiated a colonization of Saint John. However, this initiative was not realized, and the Crone's letter to the company was never answered. Despite this, the colonization of the island would eventually be carried out by Crone's immediate successors.

=== Trade and administration ===
During Crone's tenure, there was a big debate on whether free trade should be practiced in the Danish West Indies. Since the outbreak of the War of the Spanish Succession, Saint Thomas' harbor was the only neutral port in the Caribbean. This attracted a greater trade, as prizes and cargoes were brought to Saint Thomas by privateers of the warring nations, which caused increased prosperity on the island, especially for the planter class. Despite this, the company did not deem profits high enough, and a tariff of 6% was enacted for all international trade in 1704.

However, after the Peace of Utrecht in 1713, the planters' situation became desperate, as the Spanish West Indies, upon whom the planters were reliant, suffered severely. This, combined with an additional 25% tax imposed by the company, caused massive discontent among the 547 predominantly Dutch planters, (Note: In 1715, there were 160 plantations on Saint Thomas, consisting of 547 white planters and 3,042 black slaves.) who saw the Dutch Caribbean as a more profitable trading partner. Many Dutch were intermarried with the local Danish administration, which gave the Dutch a unique opportunity to dominate trade, as their connections provided them with a larger trade network and better market access.

In this regard, the D.W.I.G.C. was certain that free trade would benefit the Dutch and eventually cause the downfall of the company. Subsequently, as Danish vessels already brought in all goods needed for the colonists on Saint Thomas, Crone decreed that no one could buy from foreign ships unless the Danish supply ran out. Additionally, sermons and church services were to be held exclusively in Danish, (Note: Saint Thomas was divided into two congregations: A Danish Lutheran church and a Dutch Reformed church, where services hitherto were conducted in German.) and Crone implemented a strict Danish rule.

=== Dispute with the planters ===
As a result of this, the relationship between the company and the planters worsened. Planters started conducting secret meetings criticizing the company and its representatives, and sent a strong plea to Governor Crone in 1714, requesting the return of their former privileges. If Crone did not grant them their former privileges, the planters threatened to send their deputies to Denmark to let Frederick IV of Denmark decide the matter. When Crone refused, the threat was carried out, and in early 1715, a delegation of three influential planters went to Copenhagen to represent the planters at the Danish court. Simultaneously, Governor Crone and the island's privy council wrote detailed reports on the planters' movement, describing it as a conspiracy. Crone furthermore claimed that the planters' actual goal was to dismantle the D.W.I.G.C., and that he could solve the problem if he got a fully manned ship with 150 guns.

The planters' delegation reached Copenhagen in the summer of 1715, presenting a list of 13 demands to the management of the company, including:

- A remission of the 25% tax, substituted by a 6% tax on all goods exported
- The permission to freely export their products to any port
- That representatives of the planters should be consulted by the governor and the privy council on matters concerning the colony and its inhabitants
- The permission for members of the Calvinist faith to elect their own priest
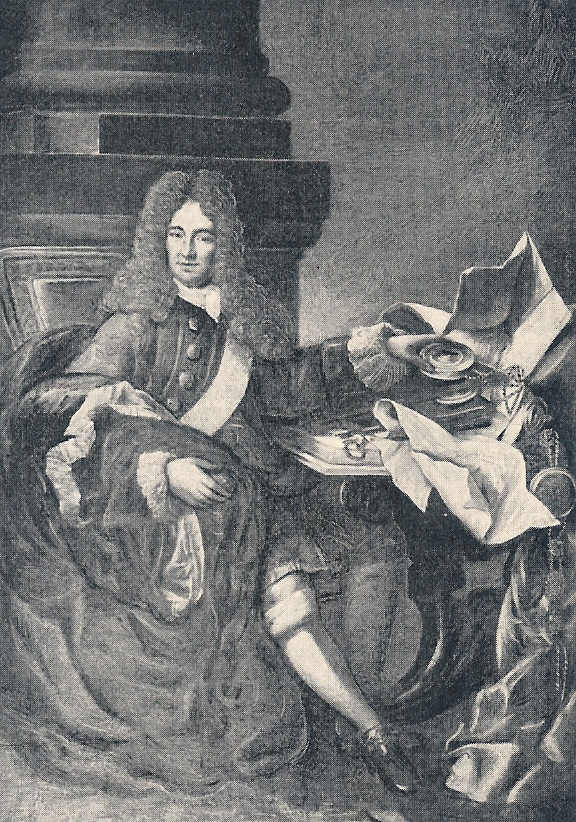
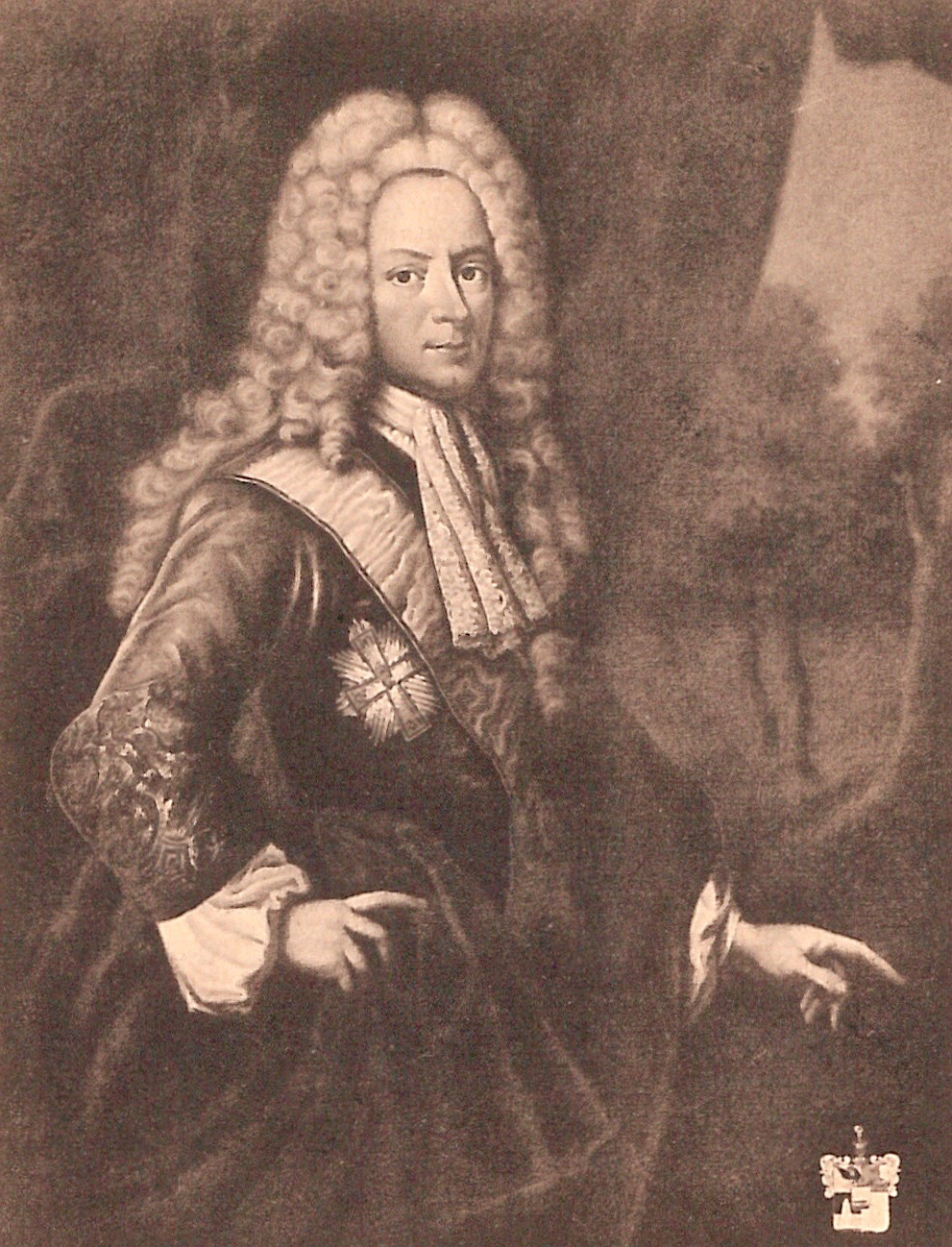
  Portraits of Christian Sehested (top) and Frederik Christian Adeler (bottom)
  The government should take measures to secure satisfaction from Spain for slaves who escaped to Porto Rico and for seized ships by the warring nations during the War of the Spanish Succession
- A more efficient assistance from the company in the prevention of fugitive slaves and a remission of the interest on slaves bought in 1707

The management did not take the 13 demands seriously, and the delegation was thus compelled to present the demands directly to King Frederick. King Frederick referred the case to a specially appointed commission on 14 April 1716, consisting of Grand Chancellor of Denmark, Christian Sehested, supreme court judge Christian Berregaard, Frederik Christian Adeler, and Copenhagen city councilor Jens Kuur. This body acted as an arbitral tribunal and had to balance between the planters' demands, the company's fear of losing its legitimacy, but also the Danish state's national economy, which must have been the most important. At the same time, there were many in the Danish central administration who were shareholders in the company.

When the commission had finalized a compromise, it was rejected by the company, and the case was thereafter referred to the Kommercekollegiet (executive agency for trade and policing), and a new commission was appointed. This commission agreed with the planters that the company had not fulfilled its requirements to have a monopoly. Based on this commission's work, the first commission prepared a recommendation for a solution to the matter, which King Frederick followed with a resolution on 16 August 1716.

The resolution ruled that the tax on goods owned by planters or other citizens who wanted to emigrate from Saint Thomas should be reduced from 25% to 10%. With the payment of 6% for exports and 5% for imports, the citizens got permission to trade freely everywhere except in the Danish Realm, Hamburg, and Bremen, but were expected to assist the company in securing full cargoes. However, the planters' attempt to secure a legislative body for their common court failed, although their decisions were to be appealed to the company directors instead of the governor. Furthermore, the king approved the proposal to issue a letter of representation (kaldsbrev) to any suitable Calvinist priest nominated by the Saint Thomas congregation. Concerning fugitive slaves, the company promised to assist the planters, although the interest on slaves bought in 1707 was not remitted, but reduced from 8% to 6%.

The outcome was, on the whole, favorable for the planters, partly due to the report by the Kommercekollegiet. For Crone, this was a loss, and an investigation was even assigned to examine and report on Crone's administration. The investigation was initiated as a result of Crone's suspicious relations with privateers, his eagerness to increase his own wealth, and his negligence toward the company's interests. Furthermore, it was revealed that Crone had illegally traded with the Governor of Porto Rico, Juan de Ribera, which caused a privateering conflict with Spain.

However, Crone was never brought before a judge, as he died on 8 August 1716 on Saint Thomas. He was buried in the Frederick Lutheran Church, Charlotte Amalie, the day after his death, and Erik Bredal was elected as the new governor on 5 September. After his death, the privy council was convicted of fraud and severely punished; meanwhile, Crone's property was confiscated to pay his debt to the company.

== Personal life ==
Mikkel Crone married Johanne Tenete Blare on 12 April 1714 on Saint Thomas. Records from the periods 1684 to 1723 and 1726 to 1732 mention Crone's mother, Birte Marie Crone, his two sisters, as well as Crone's half-brother, Erich Helmers Rud.

A genealogical register of the Danish West Indies by genealogist Hugo Ryberg claims Crone was childless. However, Kay Larsen mentions that Crone brought a three-month-old baby with him on the voyage from Tranquebar to Copenhagen between 1704 and 1705.

Crone shortly owned a white stallion in Tranquebar, which was passed over to him following Governor Andreas Andræ's death. The horse was passed over to Governor Jørgen Bjørn in 1703.

== See also ==
- Christian Porck – Governor of Tranquebar from 1687 to 1689 and 1690 to 1694
- Adolph Esmit – Danish colonial administrator and slave trader
- Johan Lorensen – Danish colonial administrator
- Frederik Moth – 18th-century Danish colonial administrator

== Notes and references ==
=== Works cited ===
- Larsen, Kay (1940). Guvernører, Residenter, Kommandanter og Chefer (PDF) (in Danish). Copenhagen: Arthur Jensens Forlag.
- Larsen, Kay (1907). De dansk-ostindiske Koloniers Historie [History of the Danish East Indian Colonies] (in Danish). Copenhagen: Centralforlaget.
- Larsen, Kay (1928). Dansk Vestindien 1666-1917 [Danish West Indies 1666-1917] (in Danish). Lindhardt & Ringhof.
- Ryberg, Hugo (1945). The Danish Westindian Islands (The Virgin Islands) (PDF). Copenhagen: self-published. p. 118.
- Westergaard, Waldemar (1917). The Danish West Indies Under Company Rule (PDF). New York: Macmillan Publishers.
- Christiansen, Caspar (2008). Handelskompagnier i dansk økonomisk politik 1670-1754 [Trading Companies in Danish Economic Politics] (PDF) (in Danish). Copenhagen University.
- Larsen, Lief Calundann (1986). The Danish Colonization of St. John, 1718–1733 (PDF). Virgin Islands Resource Management Cooperative.
- Larsen, Lief Calundann (1980). Den Danske Kolonisation af Skt. Jan, 1718–1733 (PDF) (in Danish). Copenhagen University.
- Jensen, Kasper Nygaard (2017). Religion på US Virgin Islands [Religion on the U.S. Virgin Islands] (PDF) (in Danish). Copenhagen University.
