= Moritz Hartmann (disambiguation) =

Moritz Hartmann (1821–1872) was a Bohemian-Austrian poet, politician and author.

Moritz Hartmann may also refer to:

- Moritz Hartmann (footballer) (1986–), a German footballer who plays for SV Rhenania Bessenich.
- Moritz Hartmann (officer) (1657–1695), a Danish naval officer, serving in the Danish, Dutch, French, and Venetian navies.
- Ludo Moritz Hartmann (1865–1924), an Austrian historian, diplomat and Social Democratic politician.

== See also ==
- Moritz Hauptmann (1792–1868), a German music theorist, teacher and composer
