= Christian Porck =

Governor of Tranquebar from 1687 to 1689 and 1690 to 1694

11th & 13th Governor of Tranquebar
- In office October 1687 – 1689
- Monarch: Christian V
- Preceded by: Wolf Henrik von Kalnein
- Succeeded by: Moritz Hartmann
- In office 1690–1694
- Monarch: Christian V
- Preceded by: Moritz Hartmann
- Succeeded by: Claus Vogdt

Personal details
- Born: Unknown Denmark–Norway
- Died: 1694 Tranquebar, Danish India

Military service
- Allegiance: Denmark–Norway
- Years of service: c. 1687–1694
- Rank: Captain

Christian Porck (Note: Danish pronunciation: [ˈkʰʁæsdjæn ˈpʰɒːg]) (alternatively spelled Pouch; d. 1694) was a Danish captain and governor of Tranquebar from 1687 to 1689 and again from 1690 to 1694.

== Career ==
Porck was installed as Vice Governor of Tranquebar by Governor Wolf Henrik von Kalnein in October 1687, being described as a manly (mandhaftig) and powerful captain. Practically, Porck became governor and was very capable in this position, representing Denmark's interests in the area and stabilizing the colony.

In 1689, Porck was excused as governor in favour of Moritz Hartmann, who was sent from Copenhagen. However, Porck retained his title as Vice Governor and was reinstated as practical governor the following year, as Hartmann left Tranquebar. Subsequently, on 3 October 1691, Porck received an official royal appointment to his position as governor and Commander of Dansborg.

Between 1690 and 1692, Porck improved the bastions around the city, which were initiated by the previous governor, von Kalnein. A proposal of his to further the construction of the bastions was adopted by the council of the Danish East India Company on 13 December 1690. As a result, the number of men working on the construction became c. 150 over 1,5 years. Porck would die in Tranquebar in 1694, being succeeded by Claus Vogdt.

== See also ==
- Henrik Eggers – c. 1629 – 1674 Danish businessman and Governor of Danish India
- Anders Nielsen (colonist) – 16th-century Danish merchant and colonist

== Notes and references ==
=== Works cited ===
- Larsen, Kay (1940). Guvernører, Residenter, Kommandanter og Chefer (PDF) (in Danish). Copenhagen: Arthur Jensens Forlag.
- Hartmann, Gudbrand (1895). En familie Hartmann i Danmark og Norge 1615–1895 (PDF) (in Danish). Oslo: W. C. Fabritius & Sønner.
- Abrahamson, Per Olov (2000). Danska Ostindien Vad är det? (PDF) (in Swedish). Föreningen Íslandssamlarna.
