= Siege of Tranquebar (1699) =

1699 siege of a European colony in India

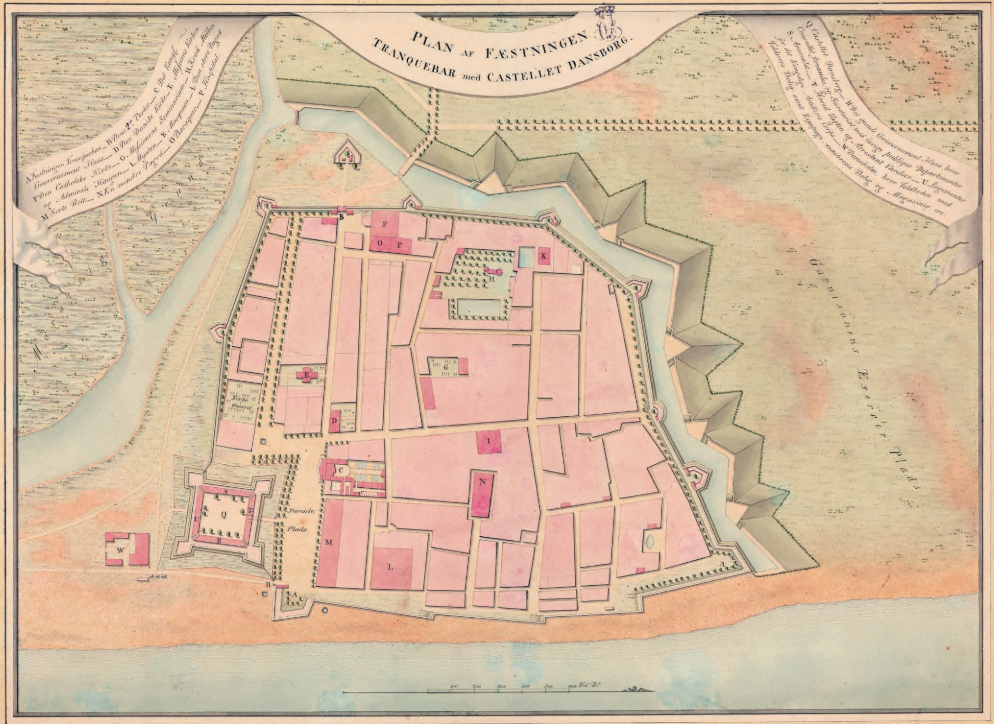
- Map of fortified Tranquebar drawn by Governor Peter Anker, 1798
Date	1699
Location	Tranquebar, Danish India (present-day India) 11°1′45″N 79°50′58″E
Result	Anglo-Danish victory
Territorial changes	Thanjavurian army retreats from Tranquebar

Belligerents
Danish India; English India	Thanjavur Maratha; Supported by: (Dutch East India Company) Dutch India

Commanders and leaders
(Danish India) Claus Vogdt; Thomas Pitt; Unk. captain (WIA)	Shahuji I

Units involved
(Danish India) Dansborg garrison English relief force	Whole army

Strength
+200 men	20,000–30,000 men

Casualties and losses
<66 (during sortie)	Heavy

The siege of Tranquebar (Danish: Belejringen af Tranquebar) was a siege of the Danish colony of Tranquebar by Shahuji I of the Thanjavur Maratha kingdom in 1699. Despite the dire situation of the besieged Danes, the English at Madras came to relieve the Danes, and the Thanjavurians would eventually retreat.

== Background ==
Tranquebar as a Danish colony was established in 1620, as a result of a treaty between Christian IV of Denmark and Raghunatha Nayak of Thanjavur. One of the stipulations of the treaty obligated the Danes to give an annual tribute to the Thanjavurian Nayak, however, because of the nearly constant dire situation of the Danish East India Company, the Danes could frequently not pay off the tribute. This would lead to a series of conflicts between the aforementioned two, and Fort Dansborg was at risk of conquest numerous times. (Note: See Siege of Dansborg (1624), Siege of Dansborg (1644) and Sieges of Tranquebar (1655–1669))

In 1699, the Danes were again on bad terms with the Indian Nayak, and the Nayak sought to resolve this by ousting the Danes from Tranquebar.

== Siege ==
The Nayak's forces numbered between 20 and 30,000 men, 1,000 of which were cavalry, and is said to have consisted of the Nayak's whole force. The Indians began digging entrenchments a mile from the town, and with hard labour they brought their trenches a mile down and were within pistol-shot from the walls. Concurrently, the Indians had shelled Tranquebar, in which they nearly demolished one of the bastions, and were thus ready to launch an assault on the town. This was when the Danish governor, Claus Vogdt, would ask the English at Madras for assistance, which was readily granted, and English forces was subsequently sent.

The Danish morale by now was low, and they considered retreating from the town into Fort Dansborg. However, at this critical moment, English reinforcements arrived and a sortie by 200 Black men was immediately carried out. Despite initial difficulties, the sorties were successful, and the Indian army retreated from its trenches.

== Aftermath ==
Subsequently, the Danes and Thanjavurians concluded a treaty about six months after the arrival of English reinforcements. Notably, the Mughal Emperor never intermeddled in the matter, despite the Thanjavur Maratha kingdom being his tributary. Tranquebar would endure another siege by the Nayak in 1718, however, he would be unable to make any impression, and Tranquebar would subsequently never be disturbed by the Nayak again.

== See also ==
- Siege of Madras – Part of Seven Years' War
- British occupation of Serampore (1763) – 1763 siege and occupation of Serampore
- Peter Anker
- Conquest of Koneswaram Temple – Destruction and desecration of Koneswaram Temple

== Works cited ==
- Milburn, William (1813). Oriental Commerce. author and published.
- Anson, George baron (1745). A voyage to the South-seas, and to many other parts of the world, from 1740 to 1744, by an officer of the fleet [R. Walter, revised by B. Robins]. Oxford University.
- Salmon, Thomas (1759). The Universal Traveller Or a Compleat Description of the Several Foreign Nations of the World. Richard Baldwin at the Rose in Pater-Noster-Row.
- Buckingham, James Silk (1829). The Oriental Herald.
