= Moritz Hartmann (officer) =

1657–1695 Danish naval officer and governor of Danish India

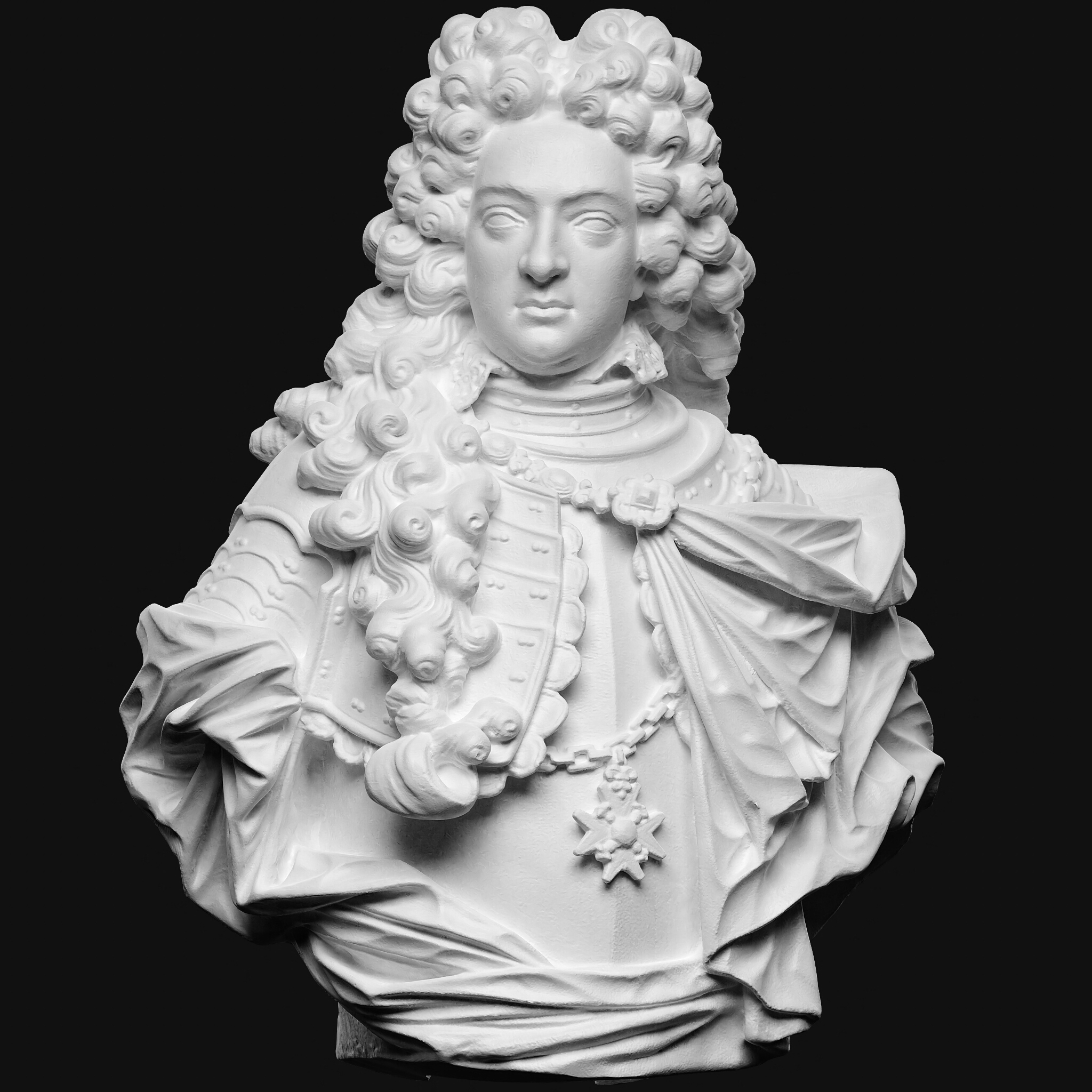
- Plaster copy in the National Gallery of Denmark of the bust of Moritz Hartmann from his epitaph in the church in Heiligenhafen.

12th Governor of Tranquebar
- In office 22 April 1690 – 30 September 1690
- Monarch: Christian V
- Vice Governor: Christian Porck
- Preceded by: Christian Porck
- Succeeded by: Christian Porck

Personal details
- Born: 1657 Heiligenhafen, Holstein
- Died: 1695 (aged 37–38) Aegean Sea
- Citizenship: Denmark–Norway
- Parent(s): Rembert Hartmann; Christine Agnes Schmidt
- Awards: Order of Saint Mark

Military service
- Allegiance: Dutch Republic 1683; Denmark–Norway c. 1682–1695; France 1684; Republic of Venice 1685–1687, 1695
- Rank: Officer
- Battles/wars: War of the Reunions; Bombardment of Genoa; Morean War; Conquest of Coron; Battle of Kalamata; Battle of Nauplia; Battle of Patras; Siege of the Acropolis

Moritz Hartmann (Note: Danish pronunciation: [mo:ʁids hɑ:dman], Venetian: Mauricio Artmant) (alternatively spelled Mourids; 1657–1695) was a Danish naval officer, serving in the Danish, Dutch, French, and Venetian navies.

Moritz Hartmann was born in Heiligenhafen, Holstein, and became a Leutnant in the Danish Navy in 1682. Hartmann entered French service in 1684 and served in the Venetian navy the following year, where he was made a knight of the Order of Saint Mark. In the subsequent years, Hartmann continued in Venetian service, distinguishing himself in the battles of Kalamata, Patras, and Athens.

He returned to Denmark in 1688 and quickly got the role of Governor of Danish India, departing for the Danish colony of Tranquebar with a minor squadron. Being handed a mandate of administrative and diplomatic character, Hartmann concluded several treaties with Indian rulers and enacted many internal reforms. After half a year, Hartmann left again for Copenhagen, acting harshly on the crew of the return voyage. Consequently, a royal commission was initiated to investigate Hartmann's actions, which was later ruled in his favor.

In 1695, Hartmann returned to Venetian service, dying of fever in the Aegean Sea that same year.

== Early life and service ==
Moritz Hartmann was born in 1656 or 1657 (Note: In an article from 2024, pharmacist and chemist Kaare Lund Rasmussen asserts that Hartmann was born in 1656. However, other, and often older, biographies say that Hartmann was born in 1657. Meanwhile, Historian Louis Bobé is unsure about Hartmann's birth year; however, he asserts that it has to be either 1656 or 1657.) during the Dano-Swedish War of 1657–1658 in the small town of Heiligenhafen in the Duchy of Holstein. He was the youngest son of deacon and rector Rembertus Hartmann and Christine Agnes (née Schmidt). The Hartmann family is native to Braunschweig, and Rembertus Hartmann is first mentioned as residing in Heiligenhafen in 1655.

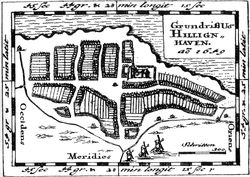
17th-century map of Moritz Hartmann's hometown of Heiligenhafen

Hartmann received his education from his dad until the age of 14 and subsequently entered the Danish Navy in 1682, becoming Leutnant in August the same year at the age of 25 by order of King Christian V. His decision to seek a career in Denmark may have been influenced by the fact that his older brother already lived there and could have paved the way for him. Hartmann was furthermore enrolled in the Danish School of Navigation, giving him permission to reside and serve abroad, with a yearly salary of 100 Danish rigsdaler. Shortly after, Hartmann went abroad, initially serving the Dutch Republic in 1683, but returned to Copenhagen at the end of the year. The next year, he entered French service, initially to participate in an expedition to Algiers and to gain experience in amphibious warfare. Nevertheless, Hartmann ultimately took part in the bombardment of Genoa, onboard the Le Parfait, attacking the western part of the city. In the same year, he returned to Danish service in Copenhagen.

== Venetian service ==
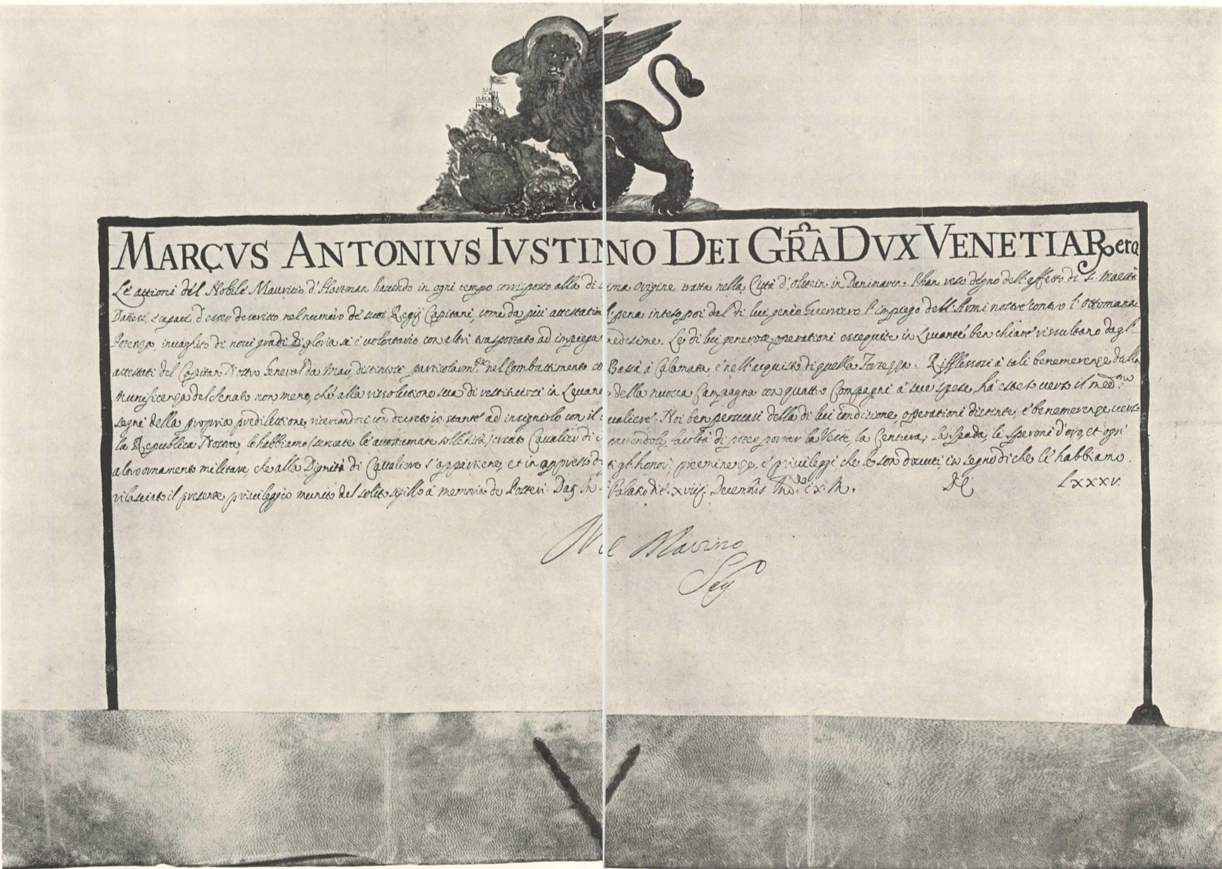
Diploma confirming Moritz Hartmann's appointment as Knight of the Order of Saint Mark in 1685

In the summer of 1685, Hartmann, along with Count Christian Ahlefeldt and probably also Hildebrand Horn, requested to be volunteers in the Venetian navy. Through personal connections and recommendations, they were eventually accepted by the Great Council of Venice.

Subsequently, Hartmann participated in the Morean War against the Ottoman Empire, serving in both the navy and the infantry as a volunteer in a Saxon auxiliary corps. Hartmann and Ahlefeldt arrived at the Peloponnese at the end of July and managed to participate in the conquest of Coron, during which Hartmann claimed to have engaged in the assault of the fortress. Continuing, at the battle near Kalamata, Hartmann showed exceptional courage and helped ensure the conquest of Kalamata and Zarnata. During the engagement, the Ottoman Turks made an incursion into the Saxon troops' ranks and inflicted significant losses. Acting resolute, Hartmann took command of the battalion led by Colonel von Triitzschler, who fell immediately at the beginning of the battle. His performance earned him the Knighthood of the Order of Saint Mark, and he was decorated with a gold chain worth 100 ducats, which he received from the Doge of Venice, Marcantonio Giustinian, on December 18, 1685. Instrumental in this was the recommendation of his commanding officer, Colonel von Tuppau, given after the battle:

I, Giovanni Bernardo Topao, Colonel of the Saxon troops hereby certify, that as the entire army landed at Kalamata and the Venetian troops attacked the Turkish army, Mr. Moritz Hartmann demonstrated great courage and ability, endangering his own life. I hereby bear witness that he excelled in an honourable way and earned general praise.

— Hans Bernhardt von Tuppau

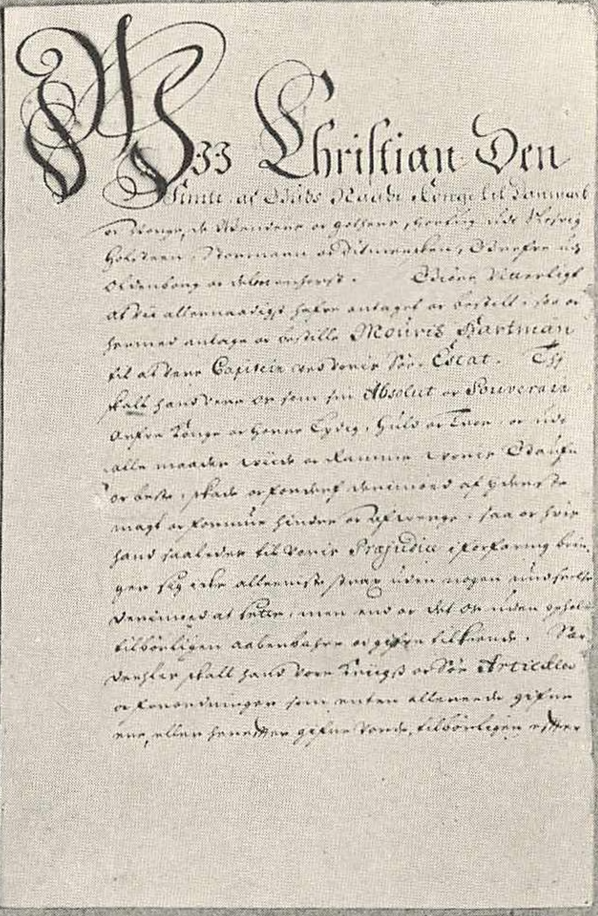
Page from the document that confirms Hartmann's appointment as captain of the Royal Danish Navy in 1687

As the Venetian army went into winter quarters, Hartmann returned to Venice, where he requested the Council of Ten to participate in the campaign in the following year at his own expense, accompanied by other officers from Denmark. Subsequently, Hartmann participated in the campaign of 1686, during which Nauplia (present-day Nafplio) in the Northeastern Peloponnese was conquered. He returned to Copenhagen in September 1686, yet quickly got permission to retrieve the body of his deceased compatriot, Christian Ahlefeldt, in Venice on 23 October. At his arrival in Copenhagen, Hartmann found out that Christian Ahlefeldt's father, Grand Chancellor Frederik Ahlefeldt, too, had died. After participating in the respective funerals, Hartmann sought to get permission to yet again participate in the Venetian campaign, while also requesting to become captain of the Danish navy. On 5 February 1687, fulfilling his request, King Christian V granted Hartmann the title of captain with a yearly payment of 100 Danish rigsdaler. In the same year, he rejoined the Venetian campaign, participating in the conquest of Patras and the sieges of Malvasia (present-day Monemvasia) and the Acropolis, during which the Parthenon was destroyed. Additionally, he partook in a voyage to the Levant, where he would visit the Church of the Holy Sepulchre. As a reward for his actions, particularly in the battle of Kalamata, Hartmann received a gold chain worth 200 ducats from the Venetian Senate. In 1688, Hartmann's permission to serve abroad was extended for another year, allowing him to participate in the invasion of Euboea, specifically in the siege of Negroponte.

== Governor of Tranquebar ==
In late 1688, Hartman returned to Copenhagen, but quickly got permission in December to serve the Danish East India Company, as Governor of Tranquebar. Hartmann's prominence and respect through his services to the Republic of Venice probably contributed to this appointment. Hartmann was to investigate the conditions in the colony as commissioner, and continue the work of his predecessor, Wolf Henrik von Kalnein. The title of commissioner was of an administrative and diplomatic character, and included the continuation of negotiations on treaties with various regional rulers, including those from Siam and the Mughal Empire. Furthermore, Hartmann got a seat in the privy council (secrete råd) and had the responsibility of overseeing the functions of other administrative roles. Additionally, Hartmann, the Vice Commander, and the privy council were to initiate a greater reduction of the company's spending.

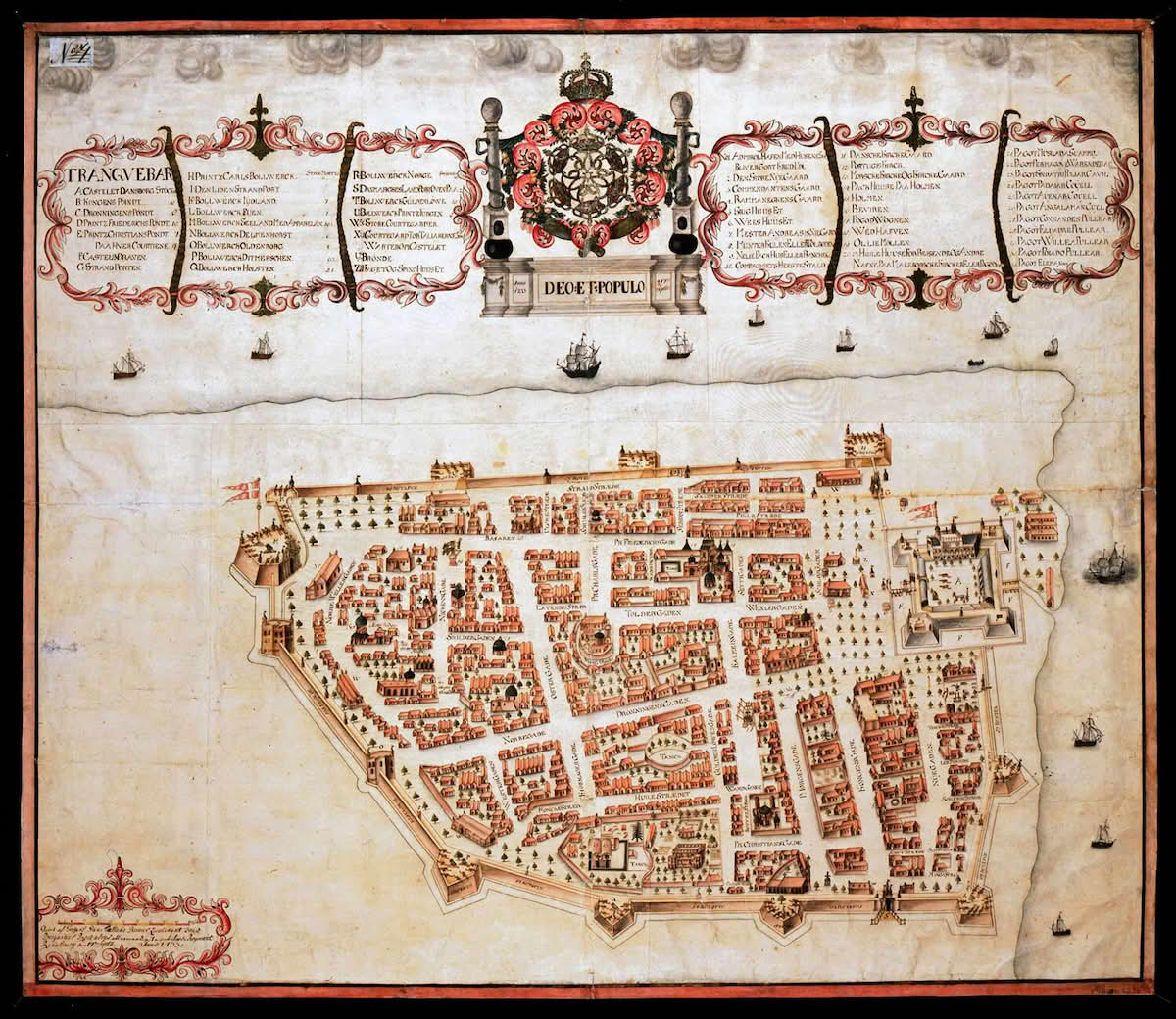
Map of Tranquebar from 1733 showing the city as it was in the 1690s, during Moritz Hartmann's tenure

At the end of 1688, the Danish squadron with the vessels Flyvende Ulv and Flyvende Hjort was to depart for Tranquebar with Hartmann as commander. However, the ships got stuck in the ice, and the voyage had to be postponed until early 1689. Furthermore, the squadron, especially Flyvende Ulv, encountered many difficulties underway, with disease, leakage, and chaotic behavior onboard. The expedition finally reached Tranquebar on April 22, 1690, after 14 months underway, having lost 97 lives. The squadron was received by a salute from the harboring ships, with Hartmann quickly continuing to Madras on Antoinetta.

After returning from Madras, Hartmann began to investigate the actions of the local accountant, Eskild Jensen, involving an incident with the former governor, Axel Juel. Hartmann also reduced the wages of sepoys, which led to numerous complaints from them. Hartmann was evidently very authoritative, which also caused the Vice Commander, Christian Porck, to be dismissed for a short period of time. Furthermore, Hartmann sent an Armenian envoy to Surat to initiate negotiations with the Grand Mughal, which resulted in an agreement on 12 January 1691.

However, he quickly became problematic there, leading to complaints in Copenhagen that he had enriched himself at the company's expense. Subsequently, Hartmann initiated his return voyage on 30 September 1690, with his ship, the Flyvende Ulv, suffering an accident and having to be repaired in Batavia. Continuing to Saint Helena, a series of illegal offences occurred aboard, which Hartmann acted strongly upon, convicting many to severe punishments, including capital punishment. Most notable of these incidents involved the chief paymaster, Gert Davidsen Klein, who, according to Hartmann, threatened mutiny, leading the ship's council to unanimously sentence the former to death. Despite Davidsen Klein protesting his innocence and his right to appeal the case to the king, Hartmann ignored his plea and had him shot immediately.

Upon reaching the English Channel in October 1691, Hartmann sought to anchor at Plymouth; however, his ship ran aground at a nearby island. With help from the local Bishop of Exeter, much of the cargo was saved, including the kattun. Despite this, many of the prominent officers died during the incident, except for Hartmann and a few others, who were rescued and arrived in Copenhagen in early 1692.

== Later life and legal cases ==
After Hartmann's return to Denmark, a lengthy legal dispute arose between him and the D.I.E.C., with the company filing a lawsuit against him. The company's accusations focused on two primary issues: Hartmann's abuse of authority, as especially evidenced by his role in the execution of the Gert Davidsen Klein, and his poor conduct during the grounding in the English Channel, allegedly in his efforts to rescue the crew and salvage the goods. The company also accused Hartmann of other misdemeanors, such as the delay in the initial departure from Copenhagen, disembarking at various locations against the company's instructions, and conducting private trade in self-interest. In response, Hartmann made a counterclaim, demanding damages for defamation, a settlement on a debt note amounting to 1,666 Danish rigsdaler issued to him by the Council of Tranquebar, and the return of his property, which was unlawfully confiscated by the company. Subsequently, a royal commission was issued by the king to investigate Hartmann and the company's conduct.

At the beginning of 1693, it was evident that the case would not be concluded during that year, and Hartmann instead requested the king to go into foreign service again. This request was presumably approved, as Hartmann mentions in a 1695 letter to the Venetian Doge that he had served the navies of France, England, and the Dutch Republic after 1688. Hartmann's attention, however, was quickly diverted to Venice, and in February 1695, Hartmann was back in Venice and applied to the senate to again participate in the campaign against the Ottomans. The application was approved, and Hartmann re-entered Venetian service, with a monthly payment of 100 ducats. Later that same year, he died at the age of 38 onboard a warship in the Aegean Sea (Note: Most sources refer to the Aegean Sea as the "archipelago" (arkipelaget), which the Italians used as a proper name for the Aegean Sea) from a fever. It is unknown whether his body was lowered into the sea or if he was buried at a local Greek church like many other naval officers.

Meanwhile, in July 1684, while Hartmann was still serving abroad, the royal commission convicted Hartmann of all charges except one and demanded a payment of 1,000 Danish rigsdaler in reparation. However, the case was referred to the Danish Supreme Court, where proceedings continued until 1696. The Supreme Court was biased in favor of Hartmann, and a majority of the judges acquitted him of all charges except the grounding of Flyvende Ulv and the execution of Gert Davidsen Klein, both of which were deferred to the Danish Court of Admiralty (overadmiralitetsretten). This court acquitted Hartmann of all charges and even praised his conduct during the grounding of Flyvende Ulv. The case was finally recommenced at the Danish Supreme Court, where the Admiralty Court's report was inspected.

The Supreme Court issued a final judgement on 14 May 1697, stating that Hartmann, with the exception concerning the execution of Gert Davidsen Klein, was to be acquitted of all 13 charges brought against him by the company. Concerning the 1.666 rigsdaler debt note, the company was to pay the debt to Hartmann; nevertheless, the latter was to pay the debt note back as a penance, with half of it going to Gert Klein's widow and the other half to the Church of Our Savior in Copenhagen. Additionally, Hartmann also had to relinquish accountability to the company regarding his earnings. On the other hand, the company was obliged to return all goods and property seized from him.

== Legacy ==
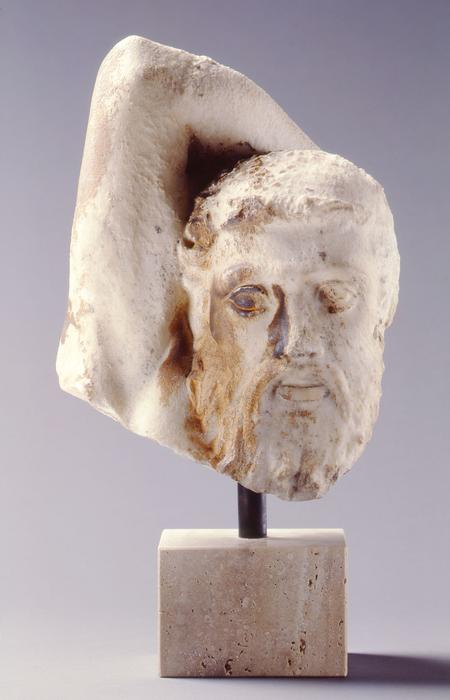
Marble fragment of a centaur sculpture given to Christian V of Denmark as a gift from Moritz Hartmann in 1688

Moritz Hartmann came from the bourgeoisie, a social class that, under Danish absolutism, gained access to career opportunities that had previously been reserved for the nobility. Hartmann was not a specialist in economics or administration, but rather a lucky adventurer who seized the opportunities of his time.

In his will, Hartmann bequeathed a sum of 500 Danish Rigsdaler to his hometown of Heiligenhafen, whose interest was to be distributed yearly by the pastor among the poor, with particular regard to widows of teachers in need. This foundation persisted until the German hyperinflation of the 1920s. Furthermore, Hartmann's family erected an epitaph for him in the local church in Heiligenhafen, which was made by Thomas Quellinus in the late 1690s. The epitaph is still standing and is the biggest attraction in the town.

=== Parthenon Centaur head ===
Moritz Hartmann has commonly been identified with a certain 'Captain Hartmand', who gifted two centaur heads of marble from the Parthenon in Athens in 1688. The fragments are among the most popular exhibits of the National Museum in Denmark and are among the oldest sculptures from ancient Greece in Northern Europe.

== Gallery ==
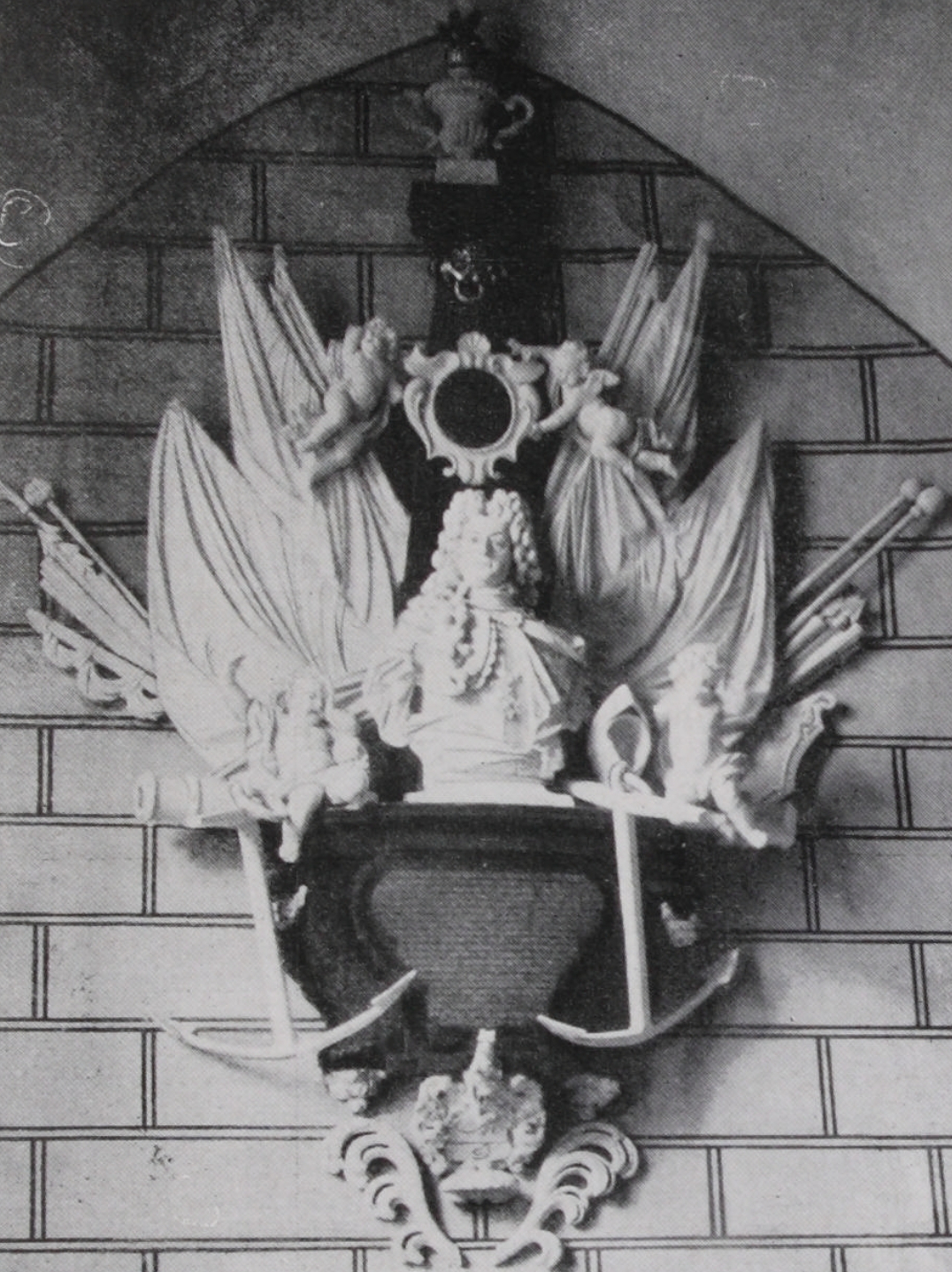
Epitaph and bust of Moritz Hartmann in Heiligenhafen Church

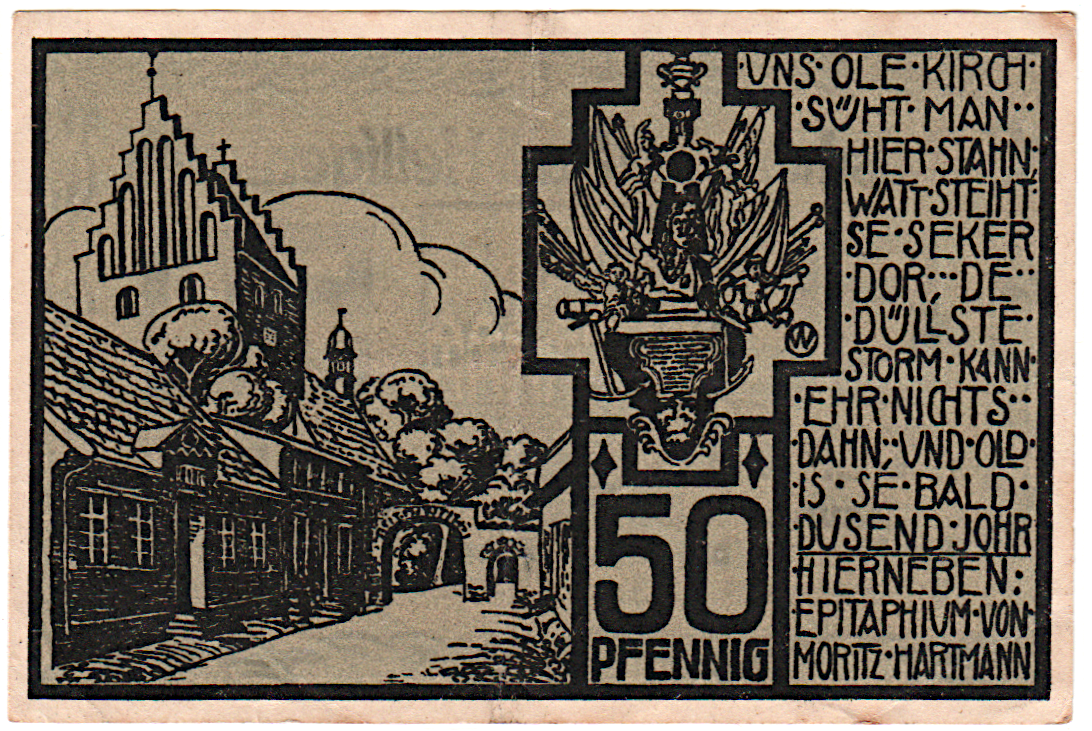
A notgeld showing Heiligenhafen Church and the epitaph and bust of Moritz Hartmann

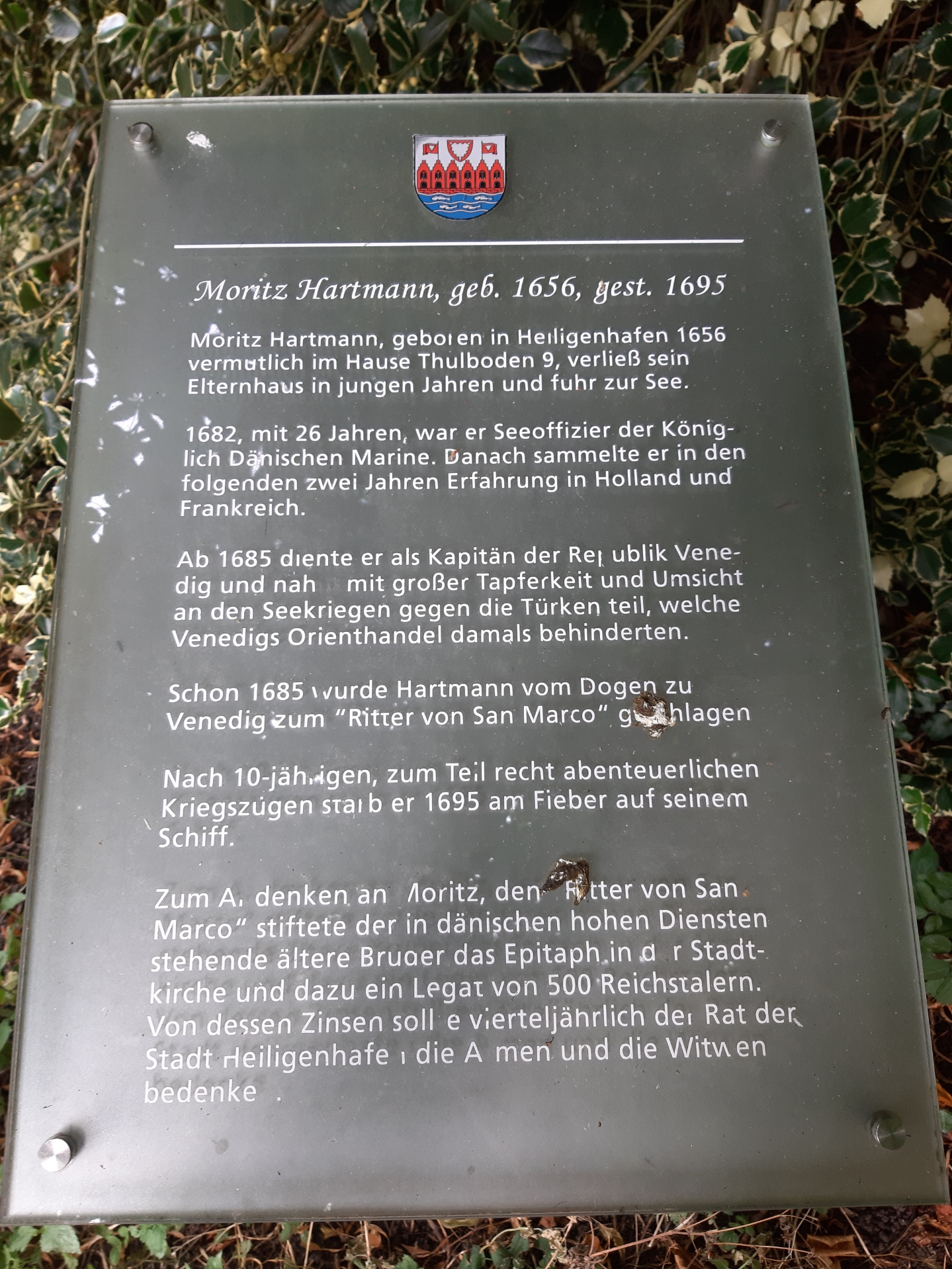
Commemorative plaque for Moritz Hartmann at his burial

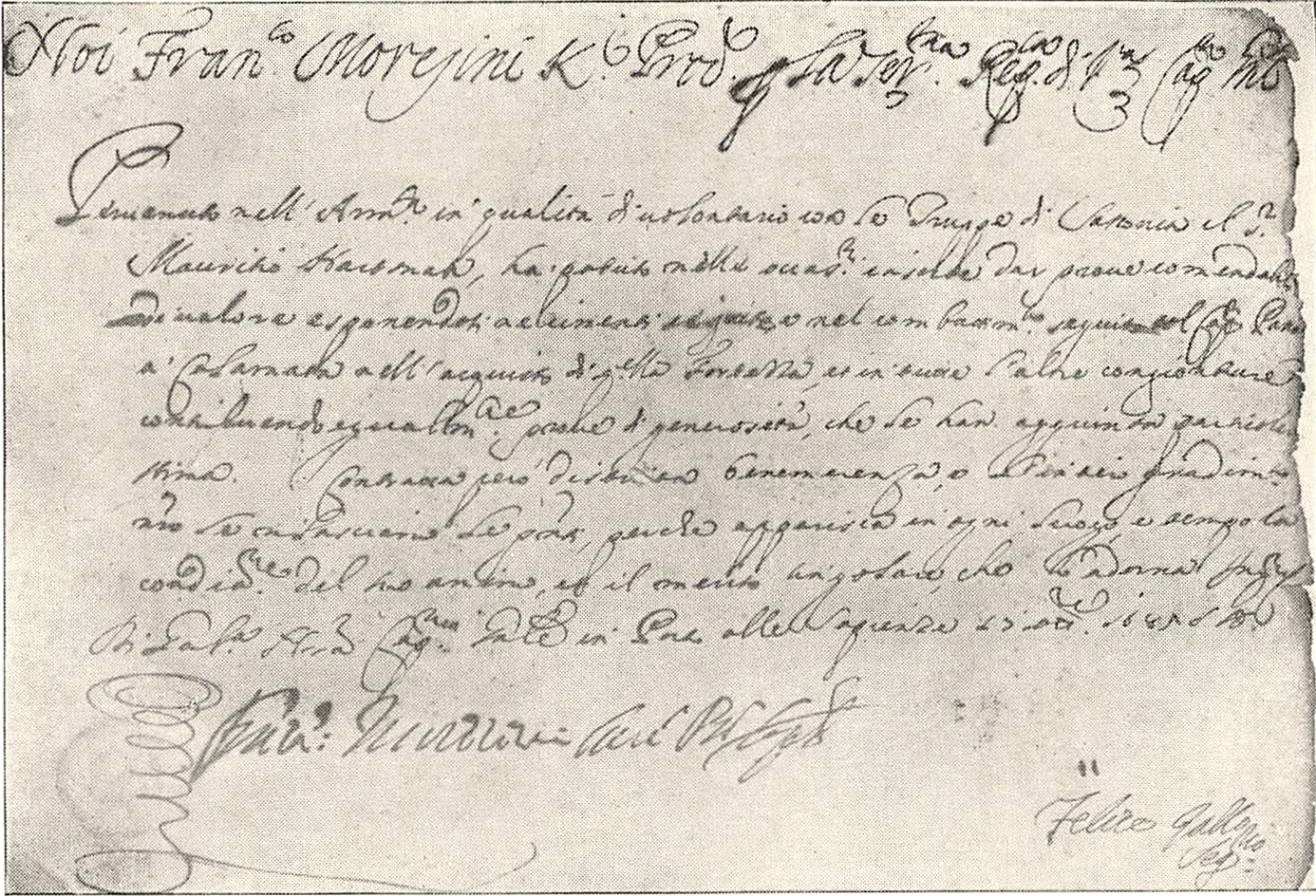
Recommendation of Hartmann, written by Francesco Morosini on 17 October 1685

== See also ==
- Cort Adeler – Norwegian seaman (1622–1675)
- Sivert Adeler – Danish captain and colonial administrator (1647–1683)
- Dano-Mughal War – Danish colonial conflict against the Mughal Empire
- Niels Juel – Danish naval officer (1629–1697)
