= Dano-Mughal Treaty =

Treaty between the Mughal Empire and Denmark-Norway

Peace treaty between the Danish East India Company and the Mughal Empire
- Context: The Mughal Empire and Denmark–Norway end the Dano-Mughal War
- Signed: 1698
- Location: Bengal
- Negotiators: Mohammed Ajumad (Denmark–Norway) Thomas Schmertz (Denmark–Norway) Andreas Andræ
- Parties: Mughal Empire; Denmark–Norway

The Dano-Mughal Treaty (Danish: Freden med Bengalen) was a peace treaty between the Mughal Empire and Denmark–Norway ending the 56-year-long Dano-Mughal War.

== Treaty history ==
During the closing years of the 17th century, Denmark wished to reestablish its commercial presence in Bengal, and they again tried to negotiate a peace. Despite previous decades of aggression against the Danes, the Mughals received the Danes well in 1698. Andreas Andræ, together with Thomas Schmertz, was sent to Bengal with ships, Indian servants, money, wares, and Danish settlers and traders. They were able to conclude peace with the Bengali governor Mohammed Ajumadi.

== Stipulations ==
According to the treaty, there were three stipulations:

- The Danish East India company abandoned all old claims.
- Bengal waived compensation for the more than 30 ships taken.
- The Danish East India company was to have all the trading rights it previously possessed, and also the right to establish a lodge at the Hoogly river

Additionally, the Danes gifted the prince 15.000 rupees and four cannons. Furthermore, the lease to a piece of land at the Gondalpara, Hoogly river (near French Chandernagore) was to be paid for 30.000 rupees over ten years. This would later become known as Dannemarksnagore, where the Danes established a factory which became their basis of trading presence in Bengal. This would end more than 50 years of war between the two nations and reestablish Danish presence in Bengal.

Christian IV

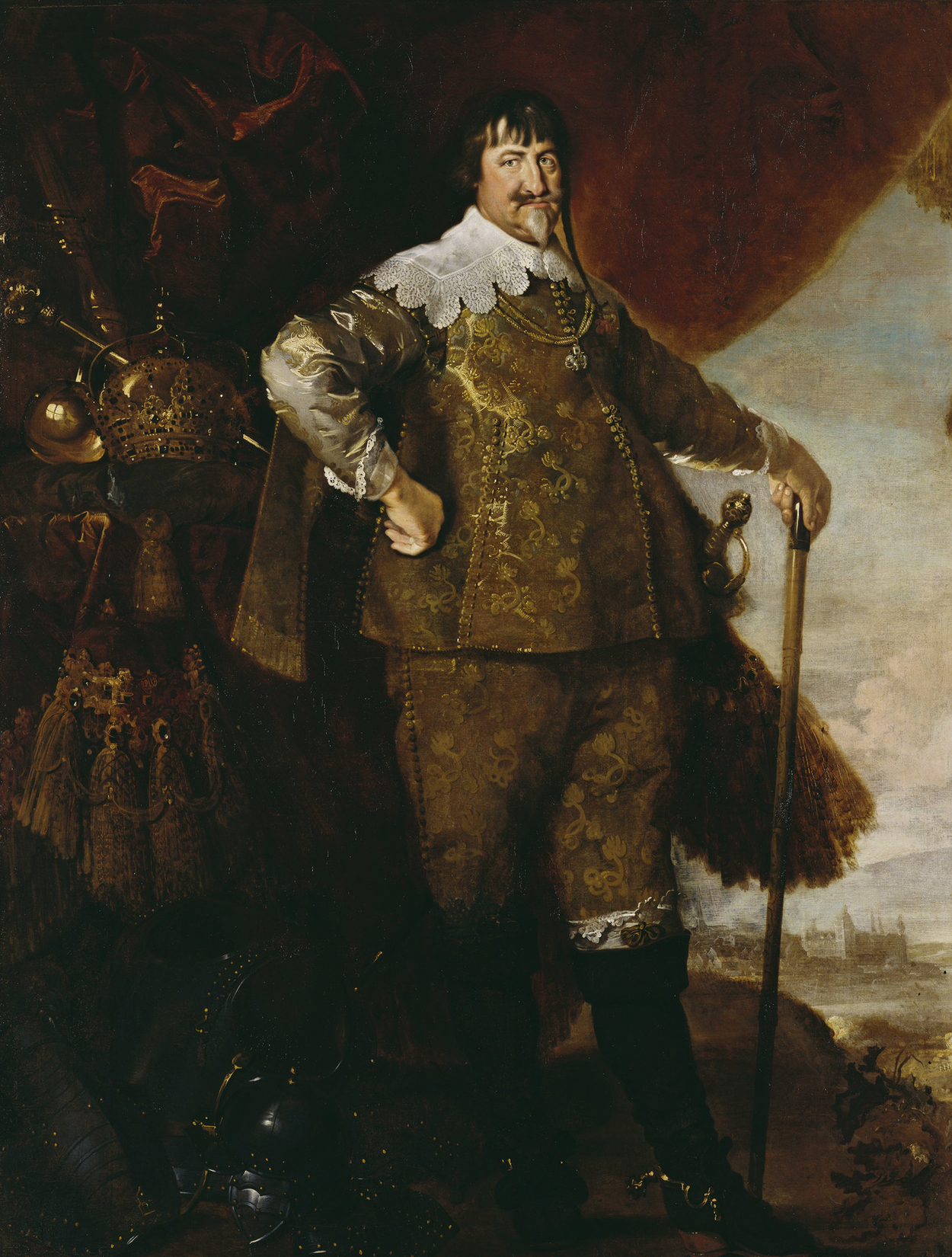
King Christian IV of Denmark, “Head and Lord of the whole Company”

== Outcome and conclusion ==
The Danish East India Company's war against the Mughal Empire is a part of the European exertion of dominance over large parts of the world, and central to early modern world historiography. The explanation to this European exertion mainly lay in the military revolution paradigm, which states that Europeans held a crucial advantage in military technology over Asians, during the 16th, and 17th centuries. This supports the explanation to why Indian merchants had difficulties for resisting against Danish attacks.

New research shows that if (or when) Eurasian governments choose to adopt a commercial oriented naval force, they could quickly incorporate the needed military technologies and strategies for defeating Western Europeans in naval combat.

The Dano-Mughal War well illustrates the differences between the governmental relationships to maritime commerce and violence. By all measures Denmark was small and poor compared to the Mughal Empire. Yet the Danish monarchy, under Christian IV, was willing to exercise state power and protect seaborne commerce. Christian offered unconditional support to his East Indian company, never wanting to reliquidate it, despite serious losses. The Mughals in contrary, were not among the Asian powers that choose to adopt a strategy of using naval force for commercial gains and had a less direct relation and support for their merchants as that of the Danes.

== See also ==
- Danish East India Company – Defunct Danish trading company
- Dano-Mughal War – Danish colonial conflict against the Mughal Empire
- Danish India – Former settlements and trading posts of Denmark and Norway on the Indian subcontinent
- Dannemarksnagore
