= Zion Church, Tharangambadi =

C.S.I Zion Church, Tranquebar, Tamil Nadu, India
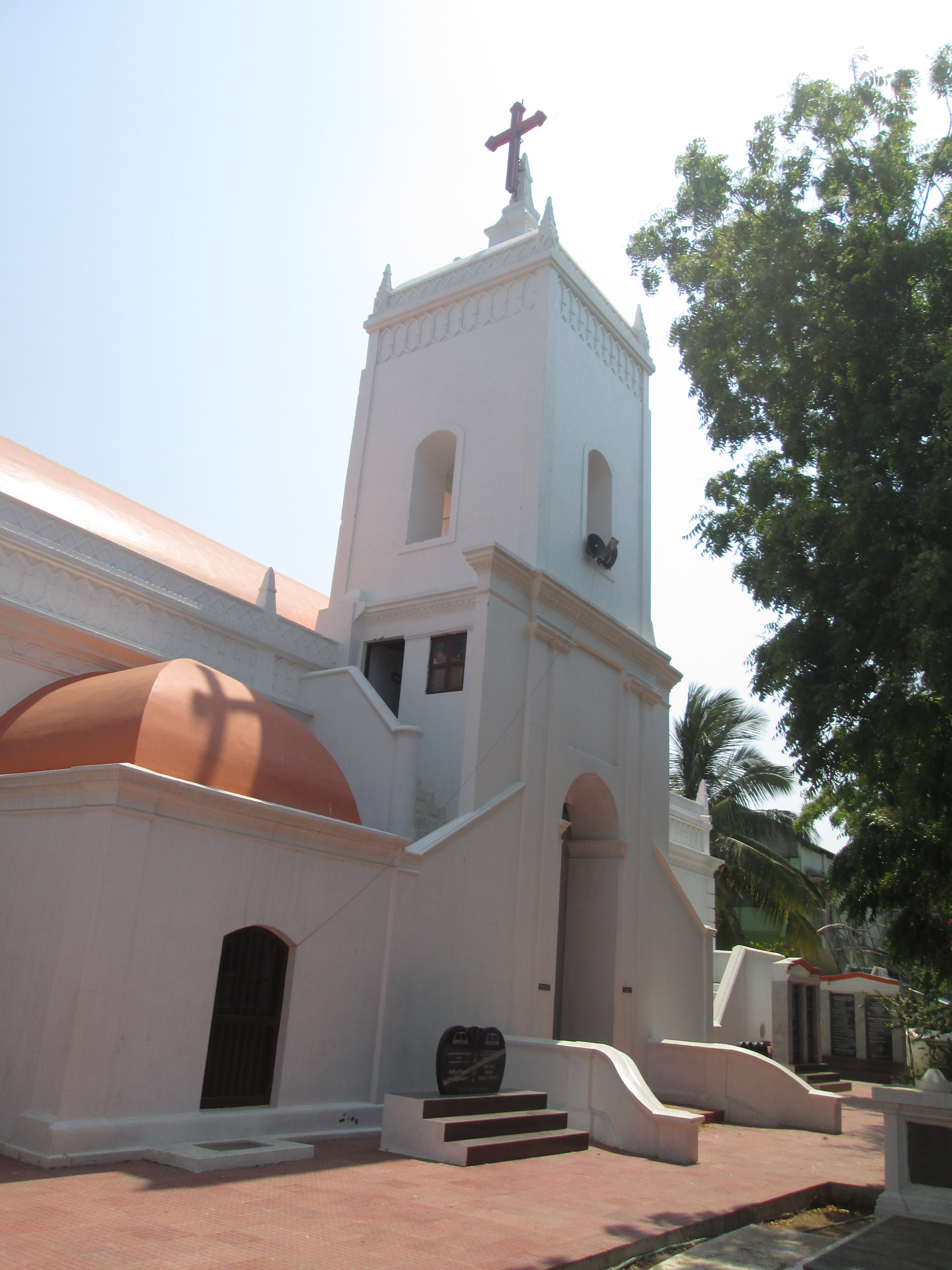
- Front view of the church

- Location within Tamil Nadu
- 11°01′33″N 79°51′17″E
- Location: Tharangambadi, Mayiladuthurai district
- Country: India
- Denomination: Church of South India

History
- Dedication: 1701

Architecture
- Functional status: Active
- Architectural type: Chapel
- Style: Gothic architecture

Administration
- Archdiocese: Trichy-Tanjore Diocese of the Church of South India

Zion Church is one of the oldest churches in Tharangambadi (Tranquebar), a Danish settlement in Mayiladuthurai district in the South Indian state of Tamil Nadu. It is in the premises of Fort Dansborg, built with the help of Danish king Christian IV in an agreement with Danish Admiral Ove Gjedde in 1717 and acted as the base for Danish settlement in the region during the early 17th century. The Church was built in 1717 Rev Bartholomew zigenbalg by A.D by Rev. Bartholomaus Ziegenbalg and has records from the 18th and 19th centuries. He is believed to be the first Protestant missionary in India and the Church is believed to be the first Protestant Church in India.

New Jerusalem Church is a working church with hourly prayer and daily services and follows Protestant sect of Christianity. In modern times, it is under the dominion of Tamil evajalical Lutheran Church It is one of the most prominent landmarks of Tranquebar (Tharangambadi).

== History ==
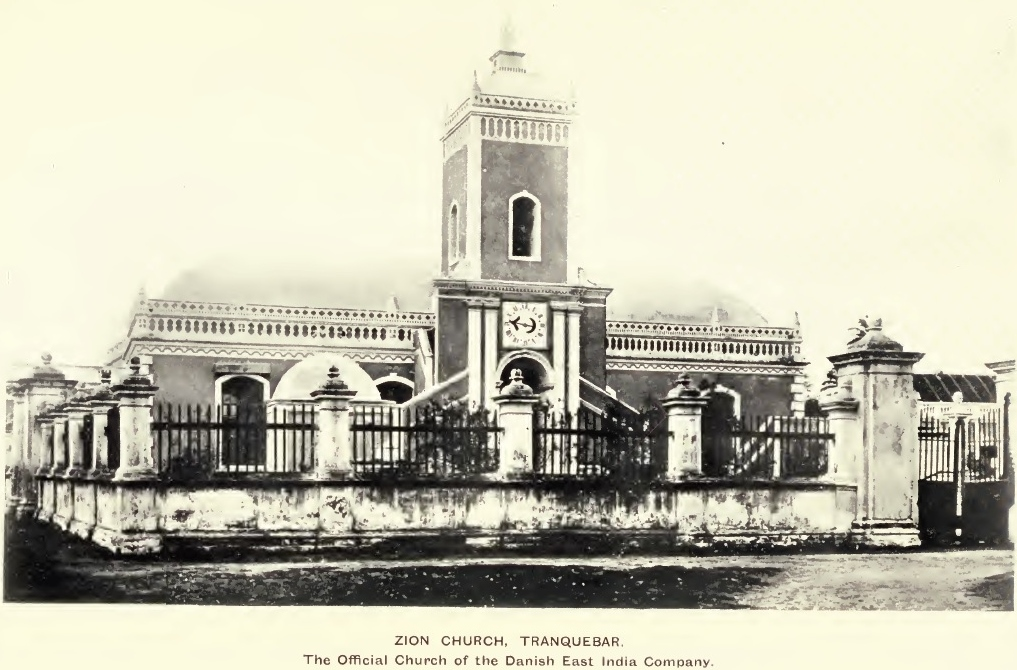
Historic image of the church

The Dansborg Fort was the most important gateway in the trade route from Europe to Coramandel for the Danish Empire. Protestant missionaries were sent from Denmark by King Fredric IV, who was also the head of Lutheran Church of Denmark. Two of them, namely, Bartholomäus Ziegenbalg and Heinrich Plütschua came to Tranquebar on 9 July 1706 and established the Tranquebar Mission. They learnt Tamil in a few years and were the first to translate and print The New Testament of the Bible in Tamil, in the printing press inside the fort. The Danish mission was the first Protestant mission in India and from its inception, was staffed by German missionaries trained at Pietist schools and seminary founded by Francke at the end of the 17th century. The Danes built the Zion Church in 1701, believed to be the first Protestant Church in India and the New Jerusalem Church in 1717. During 1919, a Tranquebar manifesto targeting a single episcopacy for all of Anglican, Lutheran, Presbyterian, Congregational and Wesleyan churches over South India was discussed at this Church, but failed to arrive at a conclusion.

== Architecture ==
Zion Church is enclosed in Fort Dansborg along with a set of buildings, the notable ones being the fort built in 1620, the Masilamaninathar Temple built in the 13th century, New Jerusalem Church built in 1718, the Town Gateway built in 1792, the Danish Governor Bungalow built in 1784 and a series of tomb stones built during the 17th and 18th centuries. The settlement inside the citadel is modeled like a small European town with a land gate and wooden doors leading to the main street, namely, the King's Street.

The church is located two blocks away from the Bay of Bengal and has an exterior made of brick, stained glass windows and tiled brick spires. The architecture indicates common features in Indian structure of the time. The altar houses conventional Methodist images and a prayer hall for the devotees. The plaques of Jesus Christ and some of the apostles are housed in glass chambers in standing posture, on the walls facing the devotees. The church was partially modified in 1782, which is believed to be the structure in modern times. There is a historic bell tower in the church and numerous tombstones too.

== Culture ==
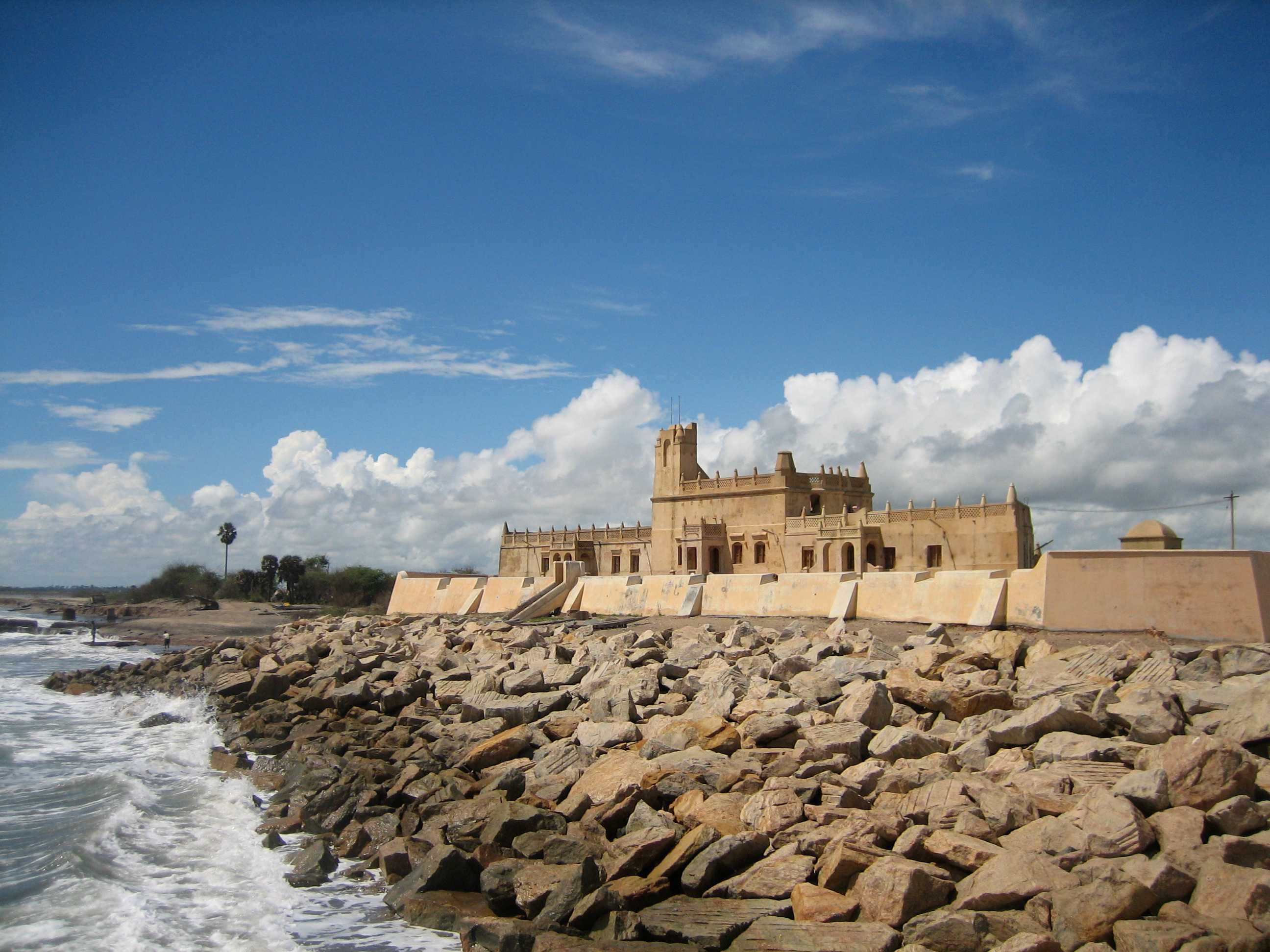
Fort Dansborg, where the Zion Church is enclosed

In modern times, the Lutheran Mission administrates the New Jerusalem Church, while the Zion church is under the dominion of the Trichy-Tanjore Diocese of the Church of South India (CSI). The Danish built the Zion Church for the Governors and the New Jerusalem Church for soldiers and the community. Ziegenbalg was the first pastor of the church and he preached in Tamil. There are records from the Church during the period of 1781 to 1814, indicating the burials carried out in the church. They indicate the expenses incurred for building of tombs, funeral services and maintenance of the cemetery.

The Church along with other buildings in the fort were renovated twice in modern times, once by Tranquebar Association with the help of the Danish royal family and the State Archaeology Department in 2001 and secondly by a project named Destination Development of Tranquebar by the Department of Tourism of the Government of Tamil Nadu in 2011.
