= Fort Dansborg =

Danish fort in the shores of Bay of Bengal

- Part of Mayiladuthurai district, Tranquebar (Tharangambadi),
- Tamil Nadu, India
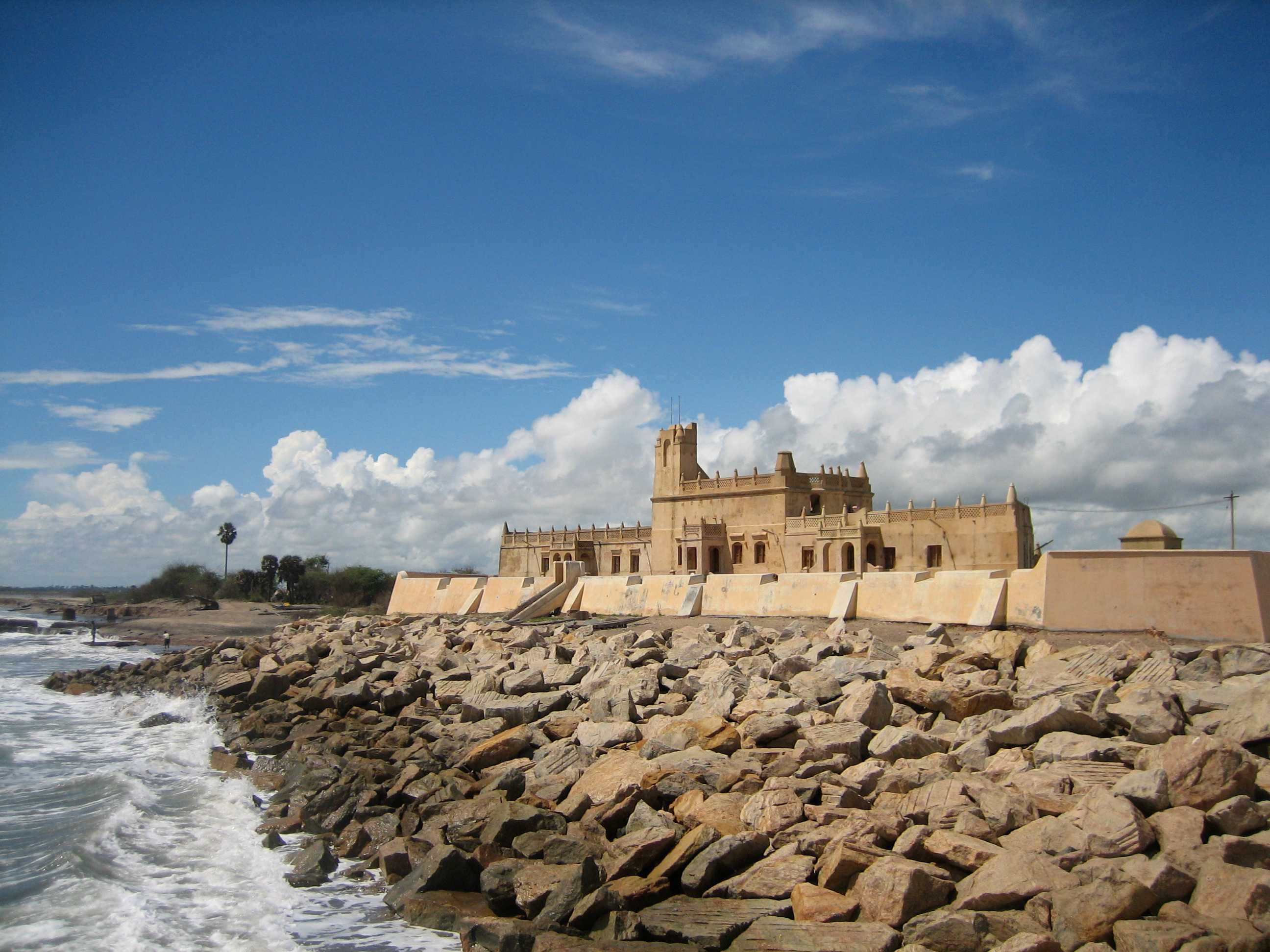
- Fort Dansborg at Tranquebar, now Tharangambadi

Site information
- Type: Forts
- Controlled by: State Department of Archaeology, Government of Tamil Nadu

Location
- Location within Tamil Nadu
- Coordinates: 11.03°N 79.84°E

Site history
- Built: 1620
- Built by: Danish

Fort Dansborg, locally called Danish Fort, is a Danish fort located in the shores of Bay of Bengal in Tranquebar (Tharangambadi) in the Mayiladuthurai District, state of Tamil Nadu. Fort Dansborg was built in the land ceded by Thanjavur king Ragunatha Nayak in an agreement with Danish Admiral Ove Gjedde in 1620 and acted as the base for Danish settlement in the region during the early 17th century. The fort is the second largest Danish fort after Kronborg. The fort was sold to the British in 1845 and along with Tranquebar, the fort lost its significance as the town was not an active trading post for the British. After India's independence in 1947, the fort was used as an inspection bungalow by the state government until 1978 when its archaeology department took control of the fort. The fort is now used as a museum where the major artifacts of the fort and the Danish colonial empire in India are displayed.

The fort was renovated twice in modern times, by the Tranquebar Association with the help of the Danish royal family and the state's archaeology department in 2001 and by the state's tourism department in 2011.

== History ==
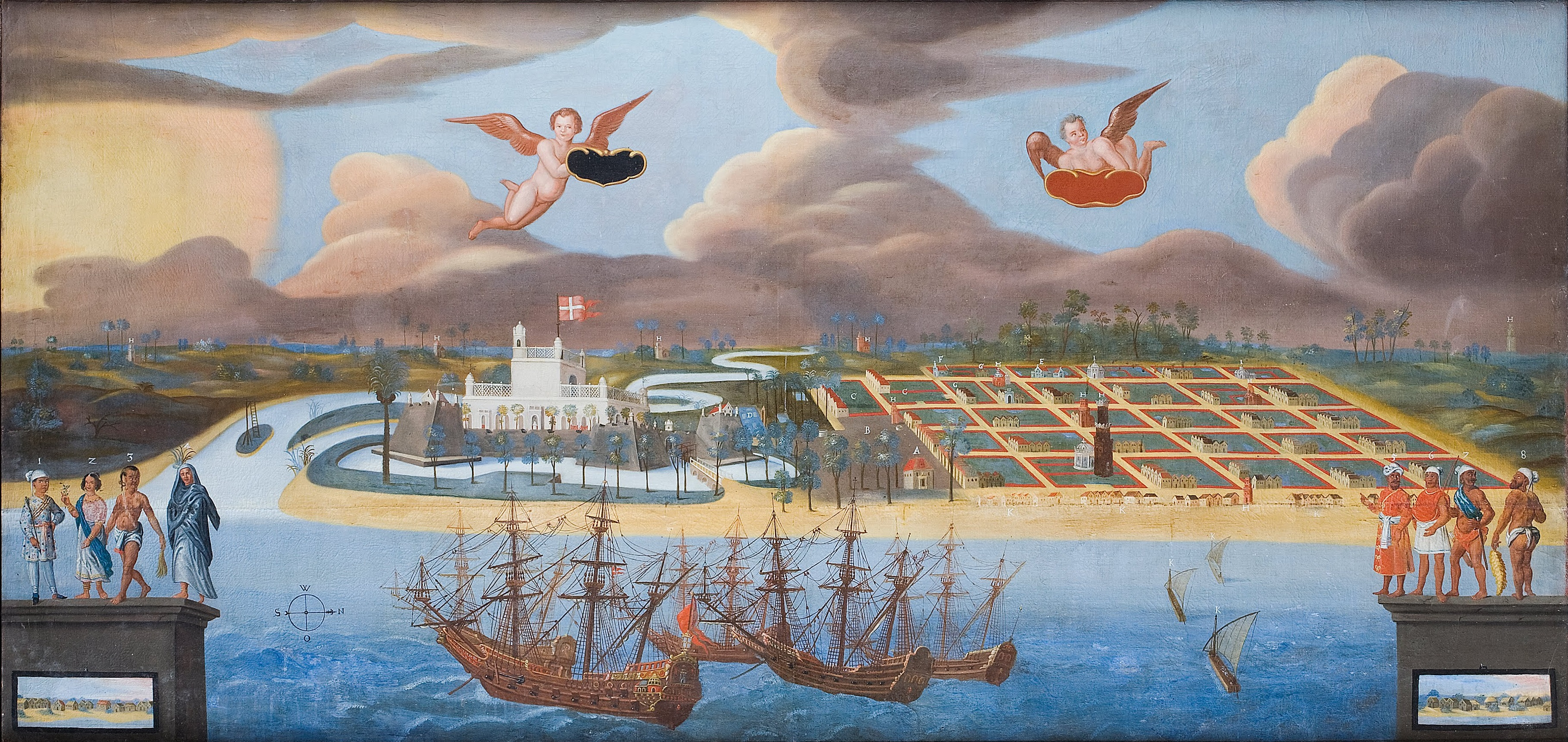
A painting of the fort and the settlement around it

Coramandel was an active international trading coast from the 3rd century BCE. The European colonial empires like British, French, Dutch, and Portuguese established maritime trade with India during the early 17th century. The Danish East India Company was established in Copenhagen, Denmark in 1616 and a mission was sent with Admiral Ove Gjedde (1594–1660 CE). Ove Gjedde signed a deal with the Thanjavur ruler king Raghunatha Nayak (1600–34) in 1620 in spite of resistance from the Portuguese. The rent was fixed as ₹3111 per annum and a total of 8 km (5.0 mi) by 4 km (2.5 mi) area was ceded to the Danish mission. The treaty signed during November 1620 also allowed the Danes to collect taxes from the neighbouring villages of Tranquebar. The treaty signed in a golden leaf manuscript is maintained in the Danish royal archives in Copenhagen.

The fort is the second largest Danish fort after Kronborg, the inspiration for William Shakespeare's Hamlet. It was built by Ove Gjedde with the help of local laborers in Danish style. The lower compartment in the basement adjoining the fort was used as a store room, prison and a rest room for the soldiers, while the governor and priests resided in the second level. Fort Dansborg was the base for Danish settlement in the region during the early 17th century. Originally a fishing village, Tharangambadi (referred as Tranquebar) was fortified by the Danish, who used the port as the main trading post for the colony, with the major export of the colony being cotton textiles. During the middle of the 18th century, the commercial importance of the town declined and the centre of textile production moved to Serampore in the state of Bengal. But Tranquebar still remained the headquarters of the Colony. The fort and the town was sold to the British in 1845 and, along with Tharangambadi, the fort lost its significance as the town was not a trading post anymore.

== Architecture ==
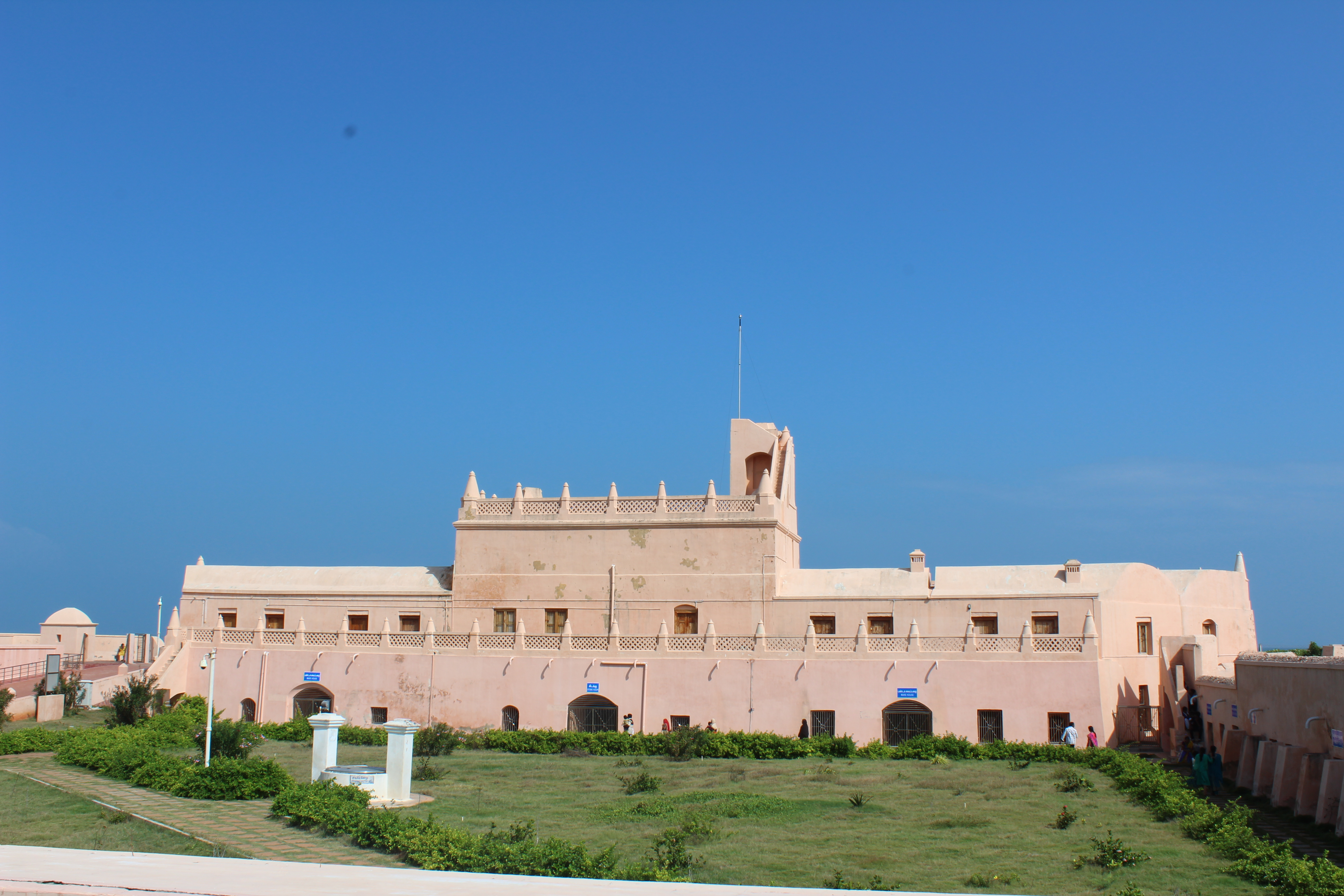
A view of the Dansborg Fort

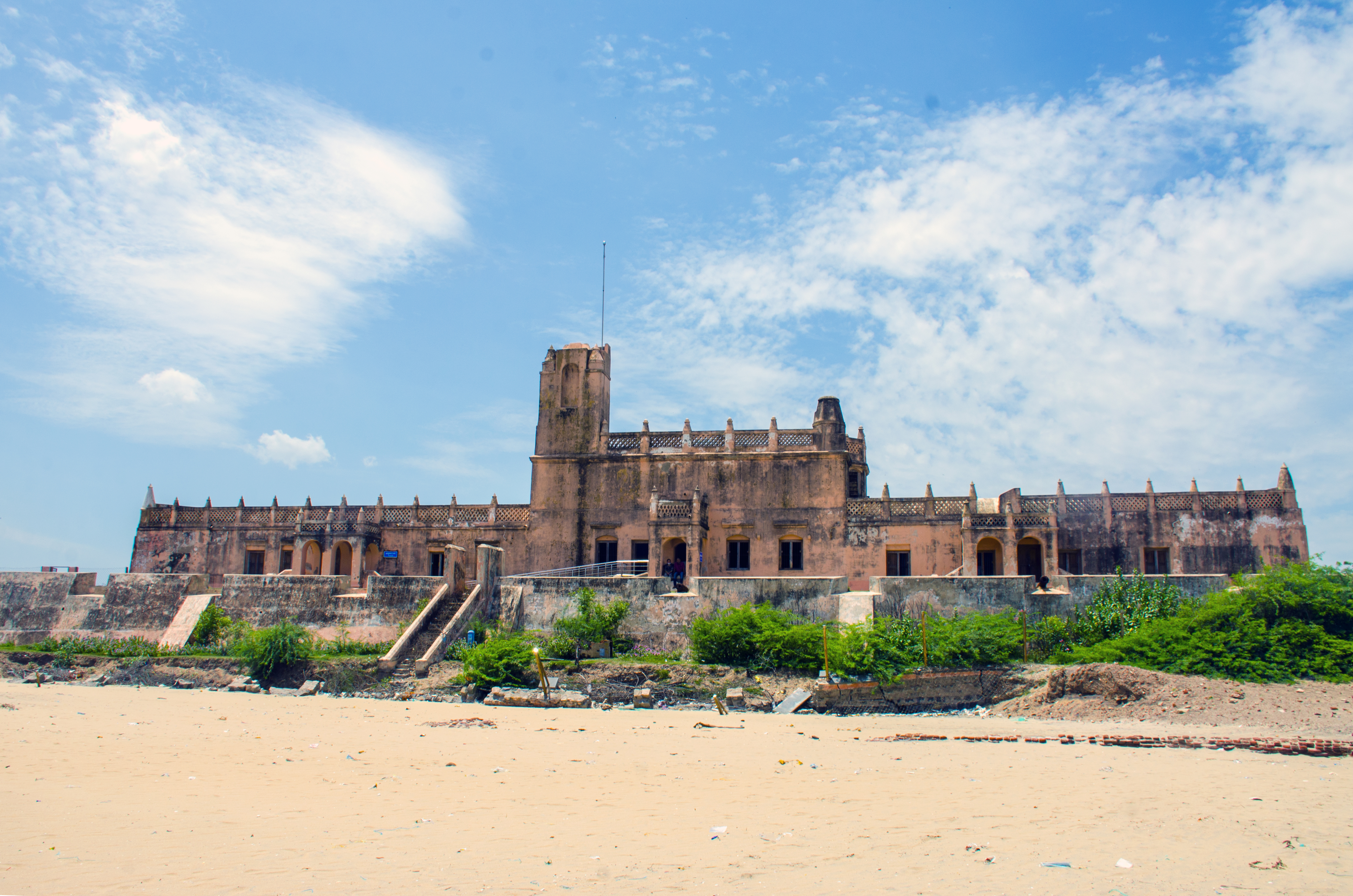
Fort Dansborg from the beach, Tranquebar

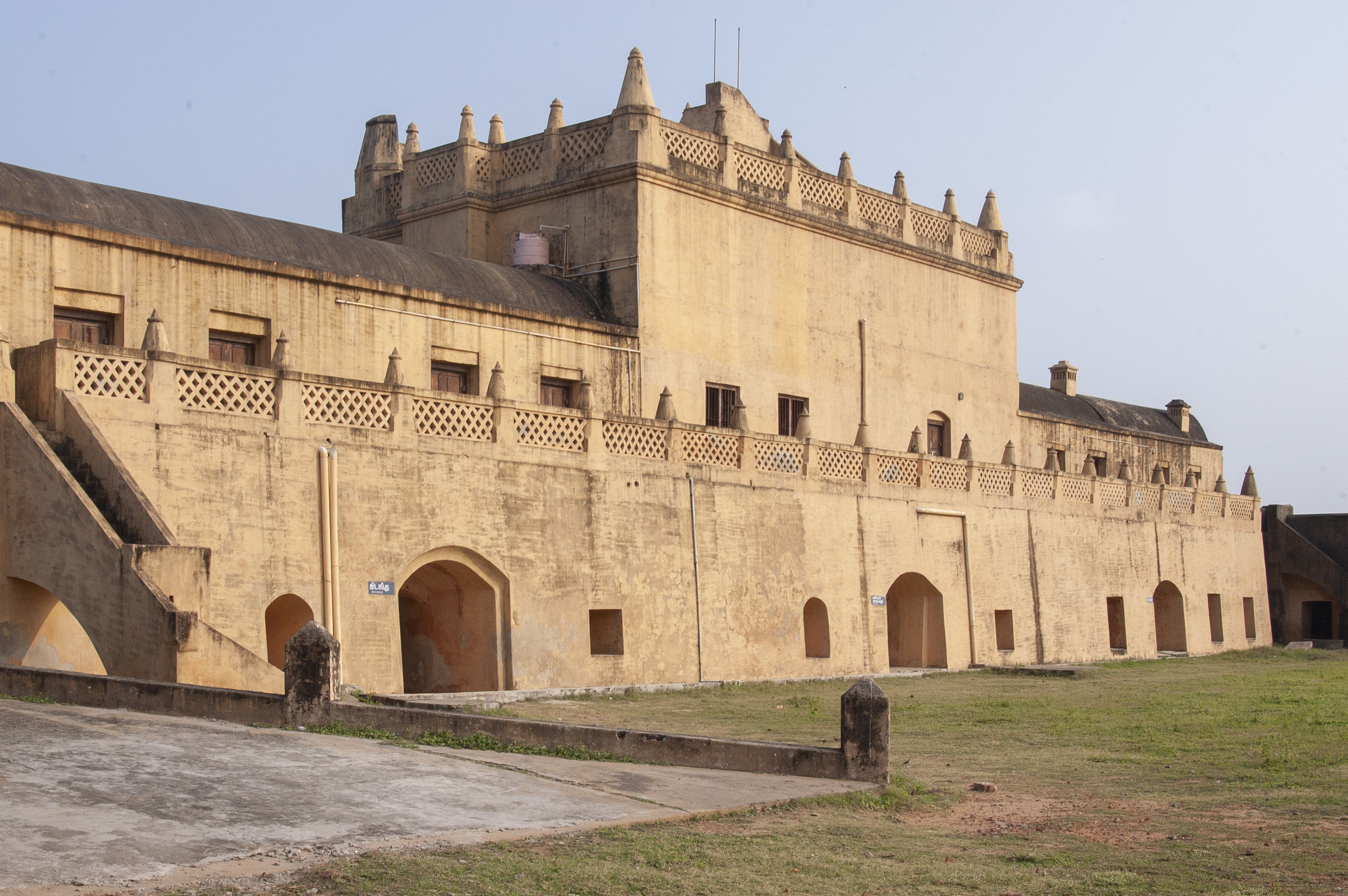
Fort Dansborg in Tharangambadi, Tamil Nadu

Fort Dansborg is located in the southern part of Tharangambadi, located 283 km (176 mi) from the state capital Chennai. It is built in Danish style, characterized by large halls, columned structures, high ceilings and projecting drapery. The length of the fort in the side facing the sea is 60 m (200 ft) and the width is about 11 m (36 ft). The fort is trapezoidal in shape with three rooms in the left wing, originally used as the governor's residence, a kitchen with an open fireplace and chimney in the top left hand corner, and a church room, now a museum, located in the centre of the building. The original rectory and the northern part of it, which are now the store rooms, are located in the right wing. The corner room on the right side was the residence of the commercial director. In modern times, it is used as a store room. The core of the building is made of brick. The main door of the fort faces north, while an additional door faces the east. The second storey of the fort has a set of guard rooms. The staircase leading to it are built with bricks. The central part of the fort has four camel hump shaped domes. The central pillar of the hall holds the entire weight of the domes.

The citadel encloses a set of buildings, the notable ones being the fort built in 1620, the Masilamaninathar Temple built in the 13th century, the Zion Church built in 1701, the New Jerusalem Church built in 1718, the town gateway built in 1792, the Danish governor's bungalow built in 1784, and a series of tomb stones built during the 17th and 18th centuries. The settlement inside the citadel is modeled like a small European town with a land gate and wooden doors leading to the main street, namely, the King's Street. Some of the notable buildings in the King's Street are the gate house, Muhldorff's house, port master's bungalow and Rehling's house. There were originally citadel walls towards the sea, which eroded with time on account of the salty nature of the environment. The fortification could not withstand an attack by regular military forces, but acted as a protection for the citizens of the settlement against predatory cavalry raids. The bastions of the fort are constructed with black stone.

== Renovation in modern times ==
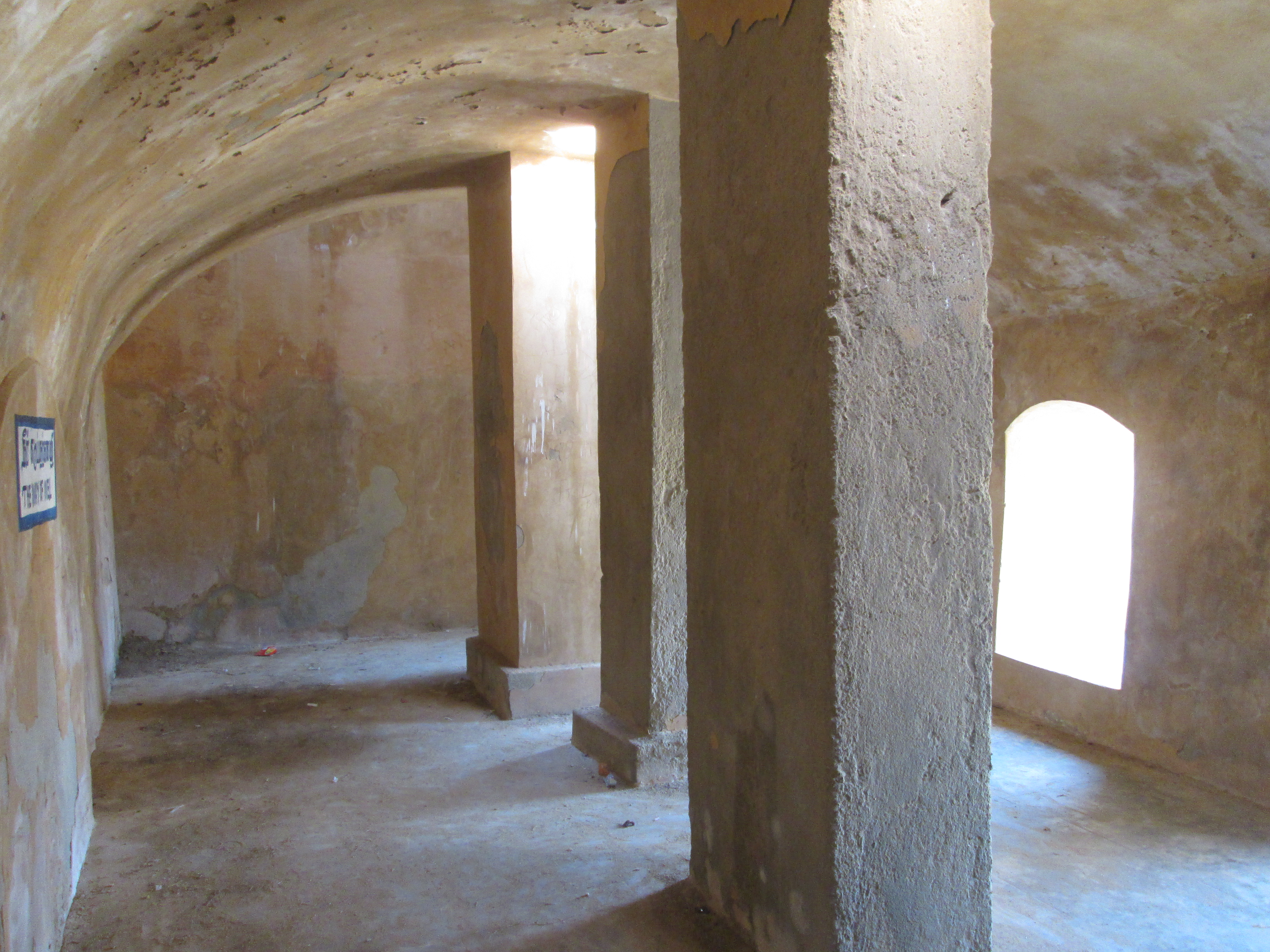
A cell inside Fort Dansborg

The Tranquebar Association, formed in 2001, with the help of the Tamil Nadu State Archaeological Department and the Danish Royal family, restored the South end of the fort with the same kind of material like brick and black stone, used during the original construction. The renovation was completed in 2005, with contributions from local artisans, Danish volunteers, and Danish and Indian experts. In 2001, chemists from the Archaeological Survey of India (ASI) restored the portrait of Raja Ragunatha Naik, Tranquebar site map, pottery, portrait of Christian IV, the Danish king.

There was a project planned by the government of Tamil Nadu to lay stones along the shores to protect the fort and the Masilamaninathar Temple in Tharangambadi from erosion. While the project was planned much before the Indian Ocean tsunami in 2004, it was implemented only in 2007. Before the tsunami, there was stiff resistance from the local villages citing impact to fishery in the region. After the tsunami, the resistance from the locals receded and the project was extended to accommodate additional areas of the shore.

The Department of Tourism Development of Tamil Nadu initiated a project named "Destination Development of Tranquebar". The project was started in 2011, with an estimated budget of ₹3,730,800 (US$39,000) and planned a phased re-creation of the fort and the environs around it. As a part of the first phase of the project, cobble-stoned pathways were laid and ornamental cast iron street lamps were installed in the path around the fort. The cobble-stone pathways were laid for a total of 350 m (1,150 ft) around the facade and for 100 m (330 ft) on Goldsmith street. The first phase was completed at an expense of ₹2,430,000 (US$25,000). The second phase of the project involved the laying of cobble-stone pathways from the Tranquebar Arch to the river promenade. The second phase was completed at an expense of ₹1,300,000 (US$13,000). Environmental protection measures, like restraining movement of heavy vehicles around the fort to maintain the highest atmospheric ozone concentration, were also implemented.

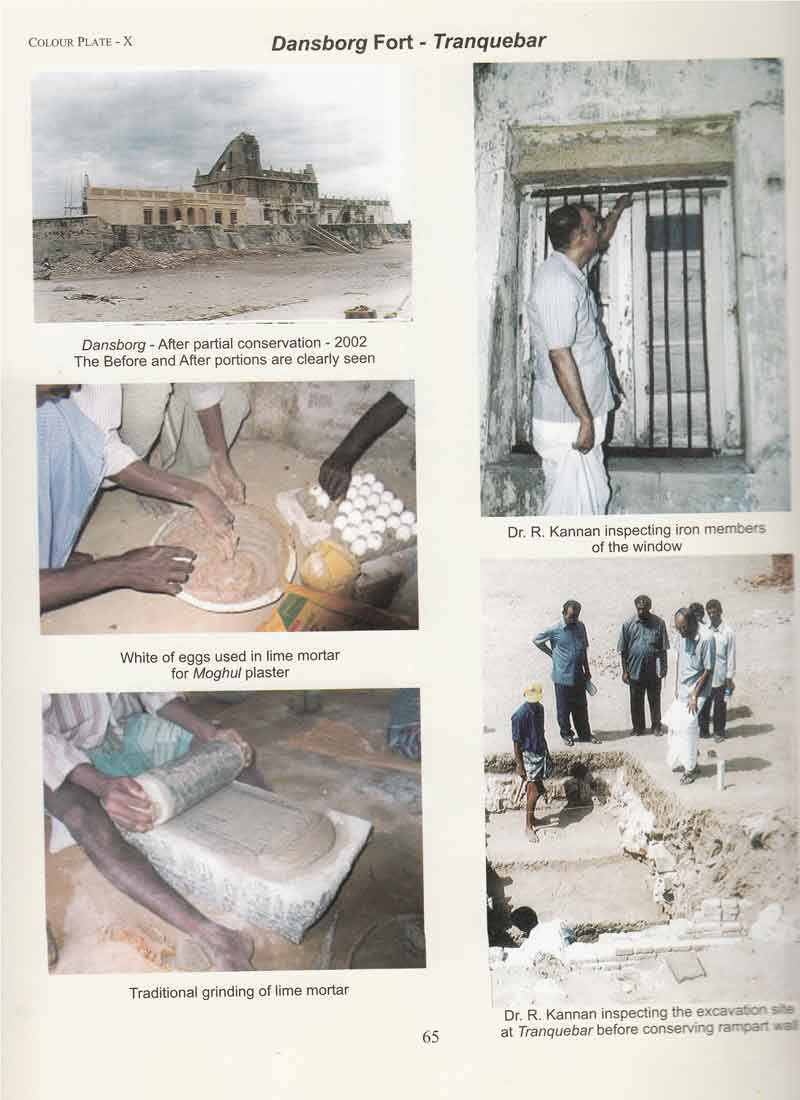

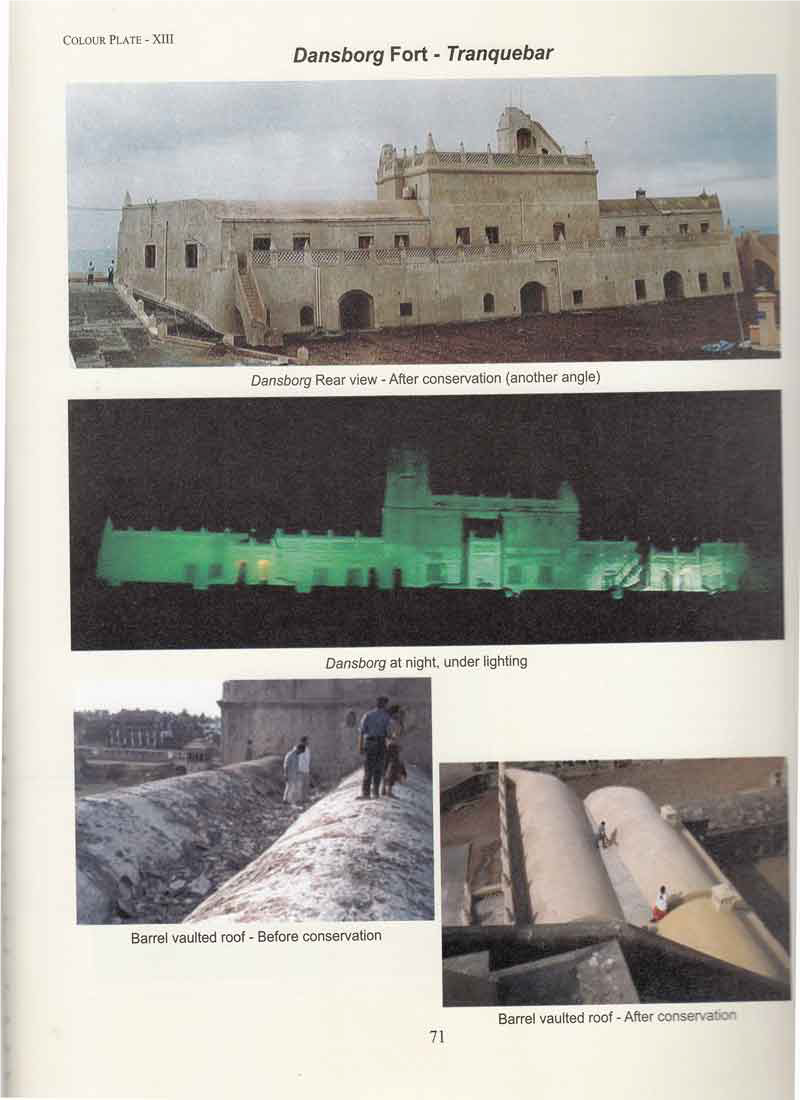

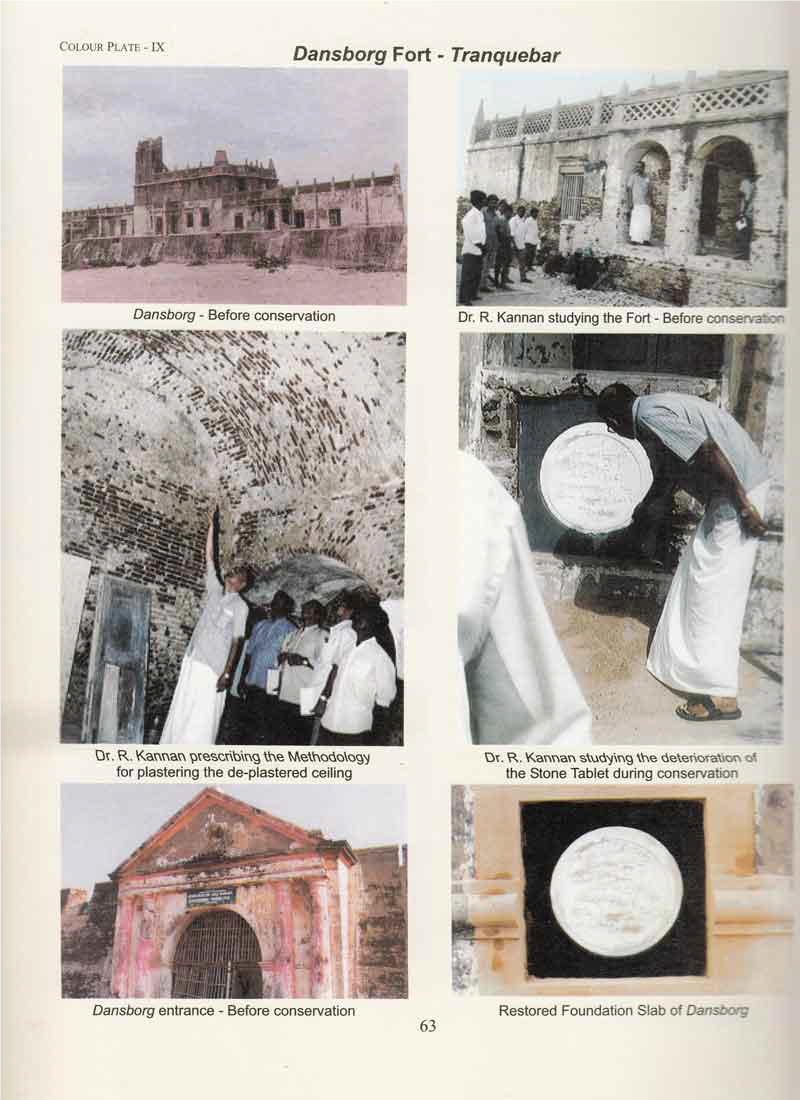

== Culture ==
A factory was established soon after the fort was constructed and it minted coins that bore the initials TB or DB, indicating Dansborg. The fort acted as the important gateway in the trade route from Europe to Coramandel. Protestant missionaries were sent from Denmark by King Frederick IV, who was also the head of Lutheran Church of Denmark. Two of them, namely, Bartholomäus Ziegenbalg and Heinrich Plütschau came to Tranquebar on 9 July 1706, established the Tranquebar Mission, learnt Tamil in a few years and were the first to translate and print The New Testament of the Bible in Tamil in the printing press inside the fort. The Danish mission was the first Protestant mission in India and from its inception, was staffed by German missionaries trained at Pietist schools and seminary founded by Francke at the end of 17th century. A Tamil-Latin dictionary containing 9,000 words was compiled there by a medical missionary named Friedrich Koenig in 1778, whose source letters are stored in the royal archives. The fort is featured in a large number of videos, films and commercials. After India's independence in 1947, the fort was used as an inspection bungalow by the state government till 1978 when the State Department of Archaeology of the Government of Tamil Nadu took over the control of the fort. The fort is now used as a museum, housing a collection of major artifacts of the fort and the Danish empire. The fort is one of the most visited tourist landmarks in the region.

== Notes ==
=== Footnotes ===
- Fort Dansborg, in modern times, is indicative of the fort alone, but the historical texts refer the citadel at large encompassing other buildings within the fortification.
