= Raid on Dannemarksnagore =

1713 raid of a Danish colony in Bengal

- Part of the prelude to the Evacuation of Dannemarksnagore
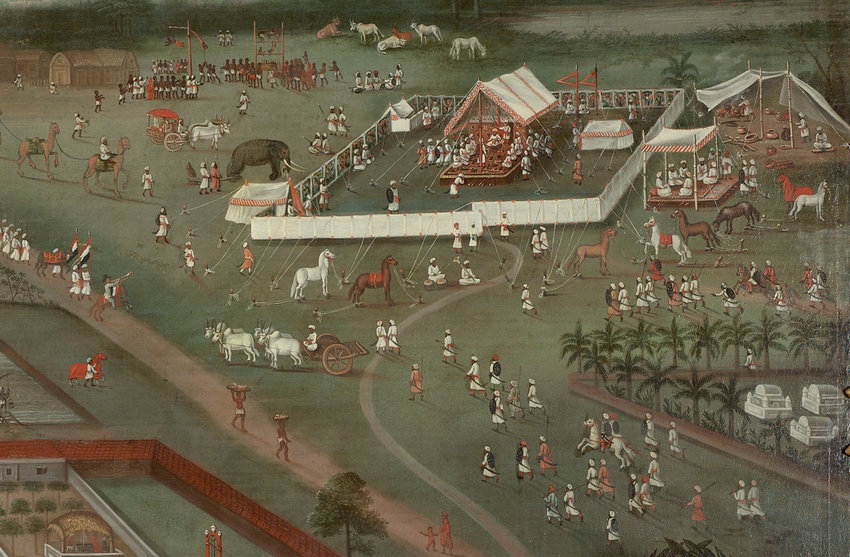
- Scene outside the Dutch factory in Hooghly, by Hendrik van Schuylenburgh in 1665
Date	1713
Location	Dannemarksnagore, Danish India (present-day Gondalpara, India) 22.8437634°N 88.3657193°E
Result	Mughal victory
Territorial changes	Status quo ante bellum

Belligerents
Mughal Empire; Bengal Subah	Danish India

Commanders and leaders
Unk. zamindar	(Danish India) Rasmus Attrup

Units involved
Unknown	(Danish India) Topass (Danish India) Factory garrison

Strength
Unknown	22 cannons Unknown no. of men (Note: Dannemarksnagore's garrison initially had c. 40 men.)

Casualties and losses
Unknown	Unknown

The raid on Dannemarksnagore took place in 1713 at the Danish colony of Dannemarksnagore in Bengal, between the Danes and a local Mughal zamindar.

After the governor of the Danish colony of Dannemarksnagore, Rasmus Hansen Attrup, refused a local Mughal zamindar's demand of 4,000 rupees in gifts, the zamindar plundered two surrounding Danish villages before laying siege to Dannemarksnagore itself. However, the siege was quickly lifted after French mediation, to which the Danes were to pay 800 rupees to the Mughals.

== Background ==
The Danish factory of Dannemarksnagore in Bengal was built in 1699 after the end of the Dano-Mughal War. However, many of the factory's initial governors were corrupt and practiced embezzlement, causing economic difficulties in the colony. Subsequently, the governors began borrowing money from local merchants, which they could not repay on time, causing the Mughals to besiege Dannemarksnagore in 1707. Although the siege was lifted and the governor, Jacob Panck, improved the factory's conditions, economic difficulties returned when Panck's successor, Wolff Ravn, assumed office.

As a result of Ravn's actions, the Danish colony of Tranquebar's Privy Council (secrete råd) replaced him with the later governor of Tranquebar, Rasmus Hansen Attrup, in 1711, who stabilized the situation. Nonetheless, the colony received almost no money from Tranquebar, and Attrup was compelled to use his own money and take expensive loans to be able to send cargo to Tranquebar.

=== Prelude ===
Concurrently, there were both commercial and political disputes with the Mughals, and rumors had spread that the Mughals would expel the Europeans in Bengal, starting with the economically and militarily weak Danes. Consequently, the Danes were ready to evacuate Dannemarksnagore in the shallop Fortuna.

== Raid ==
The Mughals subsequently took advantage of the Danish situation and assaulted the colony's commoners. In response, Attrup recruited topasses (Note: Danish colonial historian Kay Larsen uses the term mestitssoldater, lit. 'mestizo soldiers'. Mestits here likely refers to Portuguese people.) for security and invested in the factory's fortifications. However, at one point, a local Mughal zamindar demanded 4,000 rupees in gifts, which Danish colonial historian Kay Larsen described as unreasonable and sudden. When Attrup refused to pay this amount, a conflict arose with the zamindar, who plundered the two surrounding Danish villages of Tellingapore and Gondelapore, partially burning them down, and initiated a siege of Dannemarksnagore itself.

=== French mediation ===
Meanwhile, the French director of Chandernagore, François de Flacourt, and a French director of a private company, Louis de Grangemont, sent mediators to the zamindar three times, finally concluding an agreement, to which Governor Attrup had to pay the zamindar 800 rupees. Followingly, the siege was lifted, sparing Dannemarksnagore from an assault.

== Aftermath ==
Right after the agreement, the zamindar made new demands to the Danes. As a result, the governor of Tranquebar, Johan Sigismund Hassius, sent a couple of ships during the following year to assist the lodge against the Mughals. Nevertheless, the colony still did not have enough resources to maintain trade, and a new Mughal attack came in 1714, resulting in a Danish evacuation of the colony altogether.

== See also ==
- Dano-Carical Conflict – 1644–1645 European conflict in India
- Expulsion of Danes from Balasore – 1643/1644 Dano-Mughal War confrontation
- Attack in Hooghly – 1671 Danish attack on Bengali vessels in Hooghly

== Notes and citations ==
=== References ===
- Larsen, Kay (1940). Guvernører, residenter, kommandanter og chefer [Governors, Residents, Commanders and Chiefs] (PDF) (in Danish). Copenhagen, Denmark: Arthur Jensens Forlag – via Danskernes Historie Online.
- Larsen, Kay (1908). De dansk-ostindiske koloniers historie – De Bengalske loger & Nikobarerne [History of the Danish East Indian Colonies – The Bengali Lodges & the Nicobar Islands] (in Danish). Vol. 2. Copenhagen, Denmark: Centralforlaget – via Danskernes Historie Online.
- Mitra, Lalit Mohan (September 1952). The Danes in Bengal (PDF) (1st ed.). Kolkata, India: Prabartak Publishers. p. 15 – via Internet Archive.
- Thankappan, Parameswaran Nair (1984). Calcutta in the 18th Century (1st ed.). Kolkata, India: Firma KLM Private Limited. p. 90 – via Internet Archive.
- Ray, Aniruddha (2020). Bhattacharya, Sabyasachi [at Wikidata] (ed.). "The French Companies in Bengal, 1664–1720". A Comprehensive History of Modern Bengal 1700–1950. 1. Delhi / Kolkata, India: Primus Books. ISBN 978-93-89901-95-5.
