= Siege of Dannemarksnagore =

Siege of Dannemarksnagore may refer to:

- Siege of Dannemarksnagore (1707)
- Siege of Dannemarksnagore (1713), during the raid on Dannemarksnagore
- Siege of Dannemarksnagore (1714), during the evacuation of Dannemarksnagore

== See also ==
- Siege of Dansborg
