= Jacob Panck =

Danish landowner and colonial administrator (c. 1648 – 1719)

4th Governor of Dannemarksnagore
- In office 28 October 1706 – 30 August 1709
- Monarch: Frederick IV
- Preceded by: Johan Joachim Michelsen
- Succeeded by: Wolff Ravn

Personal details
- Born: c. 1648 Gunderup, Denmark–Norway
- Died: 29 May 1719 (Note: Other historians say 1713.) Tranquebar, Danish India
- Spouses: Maren Thøgersdatter (m. 1676; died 1689); Ane Harding (m. 1689)
- Children: 3, including Poul

Jacob Pedersen Panck (Note: Danish pronunciation: [ˈjɑkʌp ˈpʰe̝ðˀɐsn̩ ˈpʰɑŋkˀ]) (alternative spelled Jakob and Panch; c. 1648 – 29 May 1719) was a Danish landowner and colonial administrator, being governor of Dannemarksnagore from 28 October 1706 to 3 September 1709.

Panck was born in Gunderup in about 1648 and began his career as a merchant, later becoming raadmand (executive councillor) of Aalborg in 1678. Continuing in 1680, he became a member of the Guds Legems Lav (lit. 'Guild of God’s Body'), but resigned as raadmand in 1683. Additionally, he owned 13 properties, being the third largest landowner in Aalborg in 1682. In some of the properties, he got permission to operate hotels (herberge), making him the most notable contemporary hotel owner in the city.

In 1706, he came to the Danish colony of Tranquebar, although he was quickly moved to the Danish factory in Bengal, Dannemarksnagore, where he became governor after Johan Joachim Michelsen's death on 28 October 1706. During his tenure, Panck defended the colony during a siege against a local Mughal governor and had to rebuild and repair various parts of the factory.

He returned to Tranquebar in 1709, eventually advancing to sekonde (second-in-command) of the colony's Privy Council (secrete råd) in 1716 before resigning due to his age in 1717. He died on 29 May 1719 in Tranquebar.

== Life in Denmark ==
Jacob Panck was born in Gunderup in about 1648 to town clerk and later byfoged, Peder Panck, and Alhed Jacobsdatter Grill.

=== Merchant and raadman ===
Panck began his career as a merchant, and on 18 May 1678, he became raadmand (executive councillor) of Aalborg. Followingly, on 2 November 1680, he became a member of the Guds Legems Lav (lit. 'Guild of God’s Body'), which was a powerful merchant guild in Aalborg. On 26 June 1683, he resigned as raadmand with royal permission.

=== Hotel and other properties ===
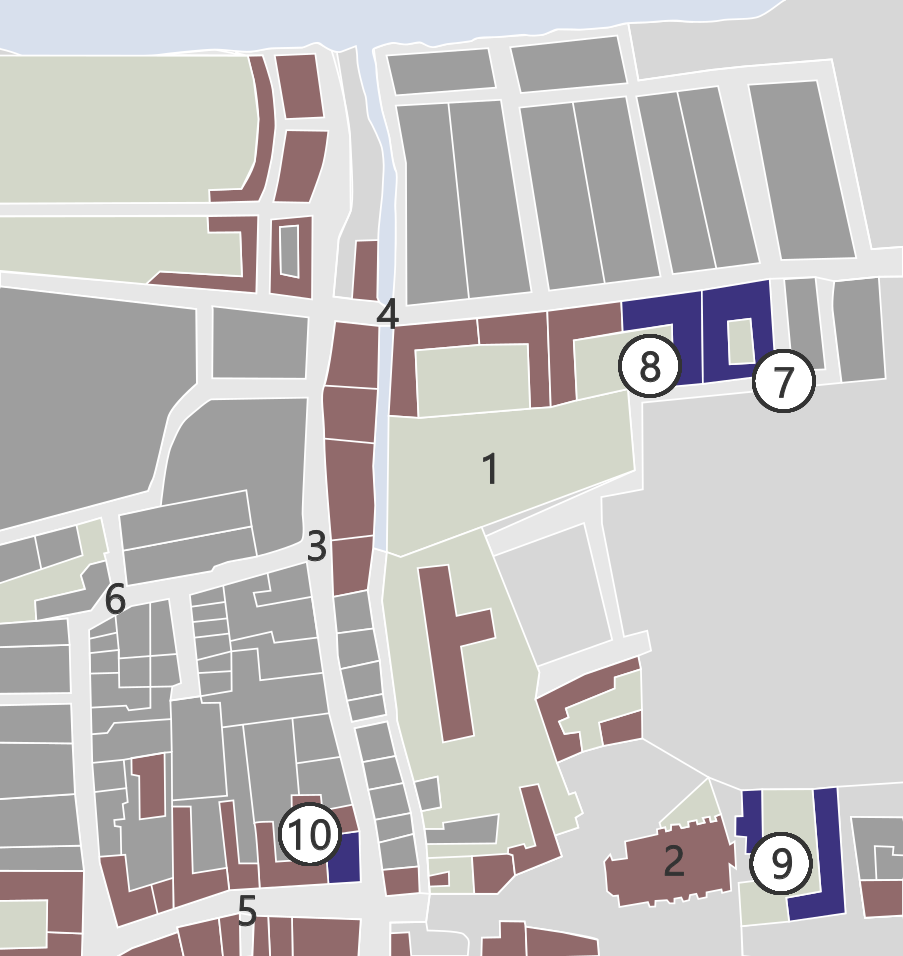
Some of Jacob Panck's properties in Aalborg between 1682 and 1706

Panck initially lived at 5 Gammeltorv, Aalborg, (Note: It is possible that Danish local historian, Kristian Værnfeldt, confused Jacob Panck with Aalborg's other hotel owner, Kai Henrik Piper, who lived in 5 Gammeltorv around 1694.) and owned 13 properties in the city, making him the third largest landowner there in 1682. This included 12 Nørregade, bought for 18 Danish rigsdaler in 1682, 52 Algade, which was rented out, and 13 Bispensgade, which his later wife, Ane Harding, inherited from her mother in 1685. Here, he would eventually reside, where he also obtained permission to operate a hotel (herberg) in 1694 from King Christian V.

Panck was the most notable contemporary hotel owner in Aalborg and possibly one of the first in the city's history. His hotel included good accommodations, as well as a courtyard (gaardsrum) and a horse stable and was expanded on 23 July 1700, when Panck received 15 Bispensgade next door.

== Career in India ==
In 1706, Panck and his family came to the Danish colony of Tranquebar, where he was employed in the Danish East India Company as an assistant; however, he was soon moved to the Danish factory in Bengal, Dannemarksnagore.

=== Governor of Dannemarksnagore ===
When the governor of Dannemarksnagore, Johan Joachim Michelsen, died on 28 October 1706, Panck became Interim Governor, as he was the oldest assistant in the colony. Upon his assumption as governor, Panck revealed Michelsen's accounts to be in complete disorder and now had to negotiate with his creditors. The local creditors demanded that the D.E.I.C. should repay all of Michelsen's debt, and Panck also had a dispute with them concerning the cargo of the vessel Printz Carl, which had grounded during a voyage to Persia in 1705. Additionally, he removed a drunken and lustful assistant, named Christian Crotz, who had caused disruption in the colony.

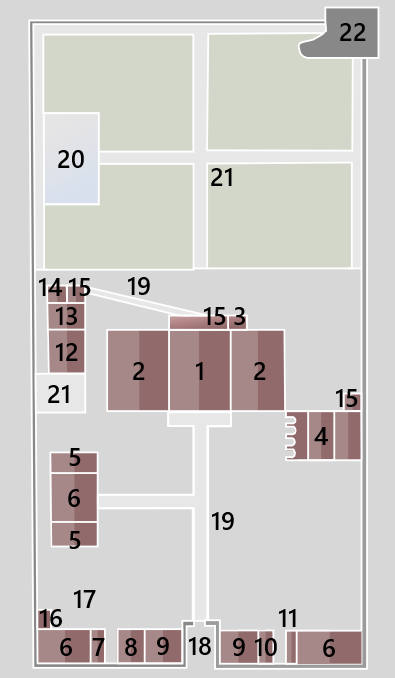
Plan of Dannemarksnagore from c. 1720 with the bastion (22), warehouses (6), hall (1), (Note: The hall was on the second floor, while the first floor had a vestibule.) and main gate (18)

Meanwhile, the D.E.I.C. was dissatisfied with the cargo Panck sent to Tranquebar, and Tranquebar's Privy Council (secrete råd) saw him as inchoate as governor. Consequently, on 20 July 1707, Christen Brun-Lundegaard was sent to Dannemarksnagore as an accountant (revideur) and commissioner. However, before Brun-lundegaard reached the colony, the conditions there changed: As Panck declined to repay Michelsen's debt until the colony got money from Tranquebar, the faujdar of Hooghly now demanded larger gifts from the Danes and raised the tariffs. Subsequently, Panck started to fortify the factory, putting both personnel and the factory in the best possible defensive condition. Nonetheless, the Mughal subahdar of Bengal, Azim-ush-Shan, still began to besiege the factory, although the siege was lifted after Panck agreed to give Azim-ush-Shan some gifts.

In August 1707, Christen Brun-Lundegaard reached Dannemarksnagore with money and resources, and successfully continued Panck's negotiations with Michelsen's creditors. Meanwhile, Panck discovered that a Danish captain, Adrian Blaumhagen, had practiced embezzlement, and his case was subsequently brought before the court. In February 1708, Brun-Lundegaard departed again from Dannemarksnagore, as he had left the colony behind with money sufficient for one year. Panck used this money to improve the factory, which was in bad shape and built with weak materials. As such, the factory's largest warehouse had to be rebuilt as it had collapsed, while the Beams over the hall and the main gate were close to disintegrating. Additionally, Panck had to replace a defensive earth bastion with a tall stone fortification during the siege, although much still had to be built from scratch. Furthermore, although there still was a tariff dispute with the faujdar of Hooghly, the relationship between the Mughals and the Danes had improved after Panck acquired the village of Tellingapore for the D.E.I.C. for a yearly payment of 169 rupees.

Already at his assumption, Panck was called an aging man, and in 1708, he is referred to as being weak, about 60 years old, and afflicted with a hernia. Despite this, he is mentioned as being honorable and capable, yet deemed unfit to serve as opperhoved because of his age, but also because of his jealousy. Consequently, the Indian historian Lalit Mohan Mitra includes him in a broader categorization of incompetent governors of Dannemarksnagore, claiming he did little to further Danish trade in the colony. On the contrary, Danish colonial historian Kay Larsen differentiates between Panck and those governors who practised embezzlement, stating that the office was burdensome because of harsh circumstances.

==== Leaving Dannemarksnagore ====
Nevertheless, Panck eventually sought to return to Tranquebar, as the Danish officials in the colony were distrustful and uncontrollable. As such, Panck left the colony aboard the vessel Fortuna around January 1709, but had to return as the ship was damaged while going down the Hooghly River. Followingly, letters about Panck's desire to resign were sent to Tranquebar by land, and on 30 August 1709, Wolff Ravn was chosen as the new opperhoved of the colony. Subsequently, the yacht Gyldenløve departed from Tranquebar on 3 September with Ravn on board, reaching Dannemarksnagore soon after. Panck consequently left the colony again around January 1710 on Gyldenløve, but it also got damaged, and Panck had to stay in Balasore, only coming to Tranquebar on 9 October.

=== Time in Tranquebar ===
At Tranquebar, Panck became a cashier (kasserer) and fourth-in-command of the Privy Council, as an acknowledgement of his fairness and firmness. Additionally, he became kirkeværger (churchwarden responsible for a church's maintenance), and in 1713, he became the chief justice (præces) of the court in a case against Wolff Ravn, who also had practiced embezzlement in Dannemarksnagore. Continuing in late 1714, Panck was installed as lower merchant (underkøbmand) and became third-in-command of the Privy Council in 1716, as D.E.I.C. management did not find anyone else suitable for the position. Furthermore, he advanced as sekonde (second-in-command) of the Privy Council on 20 October 1716, and became chief justice again in the same year in another case.

On 2 November 1717, the company management in Copenhagen decided to dismiss Panck due to his age, and he immediately resigned when the management's letter reached Tranquebar on 3 September 1718.

== Personal life ==
Panck was first married on 9 February 1676 to Maren Thøgersdatter, who was the daughter of Raadmand Thøger Christensen. However, she died on 11 June 1689, and Panck remarried on 1 November the same year with Ane Harding, who was the daughter of Raadmand Harding Petersen. Together with Harding, they had three children: Peter Panck, later amtsforvalter (regional economic official), Poul Krisk Panck (b. 1690), later governor of Tranquebar, and Vilhelmus Panck.

Jacob Panck died soon after his resignation, on 29 May 1719, in Tranquebar, and Harding was in Denmark soon after. Of his three sons, only Paul Krisk Panck was in Tranquebar at his death.

== See also ==
- Jørgen Bjørn – Governor of Tranquebar from 1702 to 1704
- Johan Sigismund Hassius – Governor of Tranquebar from 1704 to 1716
- Henrik Eggers – c. 1629 – 1674 Danish businessman and Governor of Danish India
