= Johan Joachim Michelsen =

Governor of Dannemarksnagore from 1702 to 1706

3rd Governor of Dannemarksnagore
- In office 26 July 1702 – 28 October 1706
- Monarch: Frederick IV
- Preceded by: Thomas Schmertz
- Succeeded by: Jacob Panck

Personal details
- Born: Unknown Denmark–Norway
- Died: 28 October 1706 Dannemarksnagore, Danish India

Johan Joachim Michelsen (Note: Danish pronunciation: [joˈhænˀ ˈjoɐ̯kʰim ˈme̝kl̩sn̩]) (alternatively spelled Michelson; died 28 October 1706) was a Danish assistant and governor of Dannemarksnagore from 26 July 1702 to his death on 28 October 1706.

Michelsen began as the Danish East India Company's chief assistant (overassistent) in the Danish colony of Tranquebar, and in 1702, he became governor of the Danish factory in Bengal, Dannemarksnagore, following Thomas Schmertz's resignation. During his tenure, the colony experienced economic difficulties, and he eventually became indebted to Armenian merchants, with whom he entered into various contracts for cargo.

Michelsen died in Dannemarksnagore on 28 October 1706, with his accounts in disorder, which had to be managed by his successor, Jacob Panck, and Christen Brun-Lundegaard.

== Career ==
Johan Joachim Michelsen began his career in the Danish East India Company as chief assistant (overassistent) in the Danish colony of Tranquebar, being described as an old but thoughtful man. On 26 July 1702, Michelsen became opperhoved of the Danish factory of Dannemarksnagore in Bengal after the resignation of Thomas Schmertz, with a monthly salary of 25 Danish rigsdaler.

=== Collaboration with Armenians ===
==== Contract regarding Dronning Louise ====
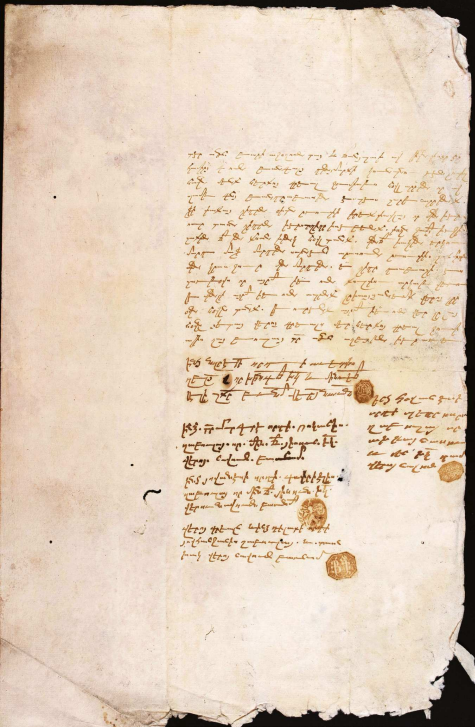
The contract between Johan Joachim Michelsen and Armenian merchants from 18 November 1703

In 1703, Michelsen bought a ship from the Compagnie des Indes named Dronning Louise, together with a couple of Armenian merchants. Michelsen wanted to restore the Danish trade and viewed the Armenians as likely partners, as the colony had economic difficulties. (Note: Since the Danes had little capital, their vessels' space for cargo was often greater than the Danes' needs, making Armenian merchants regular partners, as the Armenians thereby could transport their goods on Danish vessels.) As a result, on 18 November 1703, a contract was made between the Danes and Armenians, in which Dronning Louise would transport a whole Armenian cargo of mainly sugar worth 300,000 rupees for 5,920 rupees in return. Dronning Louise was determined to depart from Kulpi for Bandar Abbas on 9 January 1704, and the Armenians blessed the ship and the coming voyage:

In the name of God. May the Lord God provide good success and [a safe] passage. With the Help of God, on [18 November 1703], we the underwritten people freighted the Danish East India Company ship the Louiz so that with God’s [protection] it may find a safe passage to Bandar Abbas [...] on [9 January, the ship will] lift anchor from Kulpi ...

— Cossius Petrus, Avetis, Oscan, Gabriel, Hovanjan

However, in 1704, the ship ran aground during its voyage near Palmyras Point in bad weather, making the Armenians lose half their cargo. Hereafter, the Armenians requested the Mughal government to force the Danes to pay at least the 5,920 rupees back, which Michelsen, however, could not repay, as he had mainly bought the ship with the D.E.I.C.'s money without the approval of the Tranquebar's Privy Council (secrete råd).

==== Letter to Shah Soltan Hoseyn ====
Consequently, Michelsen's debt grew, and with assistance from an Armenian, he subsequently sent a letter to the Shah of Iran, Soltan Hoseyn, requesting certain trading privileges, which is mentioned in an anonymous memorandum to King Frederick IV of Denmark from between 1702 and May 1704:

When I was present in Persia at the royal residence in Ispahan, it came to pass that Mons. Michelsen, director of the [Danish] East India Company from Bengal, sent a letter to Persia to the [shah] through an Armenian, in which he petitioned to be granted certain privileges in Persia for the purpose of trade ...

— Anonymous

Soltan Hoseyn was very interested in establishing contact with King Frederick and, therefore, agreed to the request if the Danes aided Persia against piracy in the Persian Gulf. Particularly, the Danes were to provide a manned bomb vessel and fire ship, for which expenses Soltan Hoseyn was willing to pay; nevertheless, despite aid being easily provideable, this proposal could not improve the Company's economy.

==== Contract regarding Printz Jørgen ====
Afterwards, another contract was reached between the Danes and two Armenians on 19 May 1705 following some negotiations, in which the vessel Printz Jørgen was to transport an Armenian cargo worth 8,000 pagodas from Dannemarksnagore to Bandar Abbas. Although the ship reached Tranquebar in the fall of 1705, it had almost no cargo in return.

Similarly, in the fall of 1704, Gyldenløve was sent from Dannemarksnagore to Tranquebar without cargo, which spread rumors that the ship was forced to use a ballast tank, instead of regular cargo, to stabilize itself. These incidents damaged the Company's reputation, which was mockingly said to have a "water trade" by other European companies in Bengal. Accordingly, Michelsen is referred to as having acted arbitrarily, with Indian historian Lalit Mohan Mitra calling him incompetent and claiming he did little to further Danish trade in Dannemarksnagore. Meanwhile, Danish colonial historian Kay Larsen says he was unlucky, highlighting Dronning Louise's grounding.

== Accounts and debt ==
Michelsen died in Dannemarksnagore on 28 October 1706 and was succeeded by Jacob Panck, who started negotiating with Michelsen's creditors. After his death, an auction took place in Michelsen's house, revealing that he had been practicing embezzlement and that his accounts were in complete disorder, owning only 1,100 rupees while being in debt to multiple merchants, including Armenian Cossia Petrus, to whom he owed 6,243 rupees.

Michelsen's debt eventually became a casus belli for the Mughal government to besiege Dannemarksnagore in 1707, and most of his debt was paid in the same year by the later governor of Tranquebar, Christen Brun-Lundegaard, who confiscated Michelsen's belongings for 871 Danish rigsdaler, eight fanam, and 30 cash.

== See also ==
- Johan Sigismund Hassius – Governor of Tranquebar from 1704 to 1716
- Bernt Pessart – 17th-century Danish governor and president of Danish India from 1636–1643

== Notes and citations ==
=== References ===
- Aslanian, Sebouh David; Subrahmanyam, Sanjay (7 April 2025). "Uneasy Partnership". Journal of the Economic and Social History of the Orient. 68. Brill Publishers. doi:10.1163/15685209-12341647. eISSN 1568-5209. ISSN 0022-4995.
- Danish National Archives (1980). Sources of the History of North Africa, Asia and Oceania in Denmark. Guides to the Sources for the History of the Nations. 3rd Series. Vol. 3. Translated by Møeller, Mogens. Compiled by Carl Rise Hansen. Munich, Germany / New York / London / Paris: K. G. Saur Verlag. p. 335. ISBN 3-598-21474-X.
- Diller, Stephan (1 June 1999). Die Dänen in Indien, Südostasien und China (1620-1845) [The Danes in India, Southeast Asia and China (1620–1845)]. South China and Maritime Asia (in German). Vol. 8. Wiesbaden, Germany: Harrassowitz Verlag. ISBN 978-3-447-04123-2. ISSN 0945-9286.
- Larsen, Kay (1908). De dansk-ostindiske koloniers historie – De Bengalske loger & Nikobarerne [History of the Danish East Indian Colonies – The Bengali Lodges & the Nicobar Islands] (in Danish). Vol. 2. Copenhagen, Denmark: Centralforlaget – via Danskernes Historie Online.
- Larsen, Kay (1940). Guvernører, residenter, kommandanter og chefer [Governors, Residents, Commanders and Chiefs] (PDF) (in Danish). Copenhagen, Denmark: Arthur Jensens Forlag – via Danskernes Historie Online.
- Mitra, Lalit Mohan (September 1952). The Danes in Bengal (PDF) (1st ed.). Kolkata, India: Prabartak Publishers – via Internet Archive.
