= Wolff Ravn =

Governor of Dannemarksnagore from 1709 to 1711

5th Governor of Dannemarksnagore
- In office 3 September 1709 – 1 October 1711
- Monarch: Frederick IV
- Preceded by: Jacob Panck
- Succeeded by: Rasmus Hansen Attrup

Personal details
- Born: Unknown Denmark–Norway
- Died: Unknown Bremerholm, Denmark–Norway
- Spouse: Anna Jørgensdatter Larsen
- Children: 1

Wolff Ravn (Note: Danish pronunciation: [ˈvɒlˀf] or [ˈvulˀf ˈʁɑwˀn]) (alternative spelled Wolf or Wulf; fl. 1705–1714) was a Danish colonial official and governor of Dannemarksnagore from 3 September 1709 to 1 October 1711.

Ravn started as an assistant in the Danish East India Company's merchantry in the Danish colony of Tranquebar, and in 1706, he was chosen as the governor of the Danish factory in Bengal, Dannemarksnagore, succeeding Jacob Panck. During his tenure, the colony experienced economic difficulties, and he was subsequently placed under citizen's arrest by his successor, Rasmus Hansen Attrup, in 1711. Despite attempting to escape, Ravn was eventually convicted and sentenced to life in prison at Bremerholm in Copenhagen.

== Career ==
Wolff Ravn began his career as an assistant in the Danish East India Company's merchantry in the Danish colony of Tranquebar. In 1705, he became a ship’s assistant aboard the vessel Printz Carl and participated in its voyage to Persia, where it grounded. He returned to Tranquebar in 1706 and was chosen by the D.E.I.C. management as governor of the Danish factory in Bengal, Dannemarksnagore, on 30 August 1709, succeeding Jacob Panck. In this regard, the governor of Tranquebar, Johan Sigismund Hassius, refers to him as young and unthorough, yet reasonable relative to his young age.

=== Governor of Dannemarksnagore ===
Subsequently, Ravn departed from Tranquebar on 3 September on board the yacht Gyldenløve, reaching Dannemarksnagore soon after. In Dannemarksnagore, Ravn quickly dismantled Panck's work, acting arbitrarily to the Company's disadvantage. Evidently, he gave large gifts to the local Mughal governor, although receiving the village of Gondelapore in return in 1710. However, the newly assumed dewan of Bengal, Murshid Quli Khan, now demanded 30,000 rupees in gifts, in order for the Company to get a firman that secured their trading privileges in Bengal.

Meanwhile, in a letter from 12 January 1711, Ravn mentions the factory, which was already in bad shape and built with weak materials, to be decaying. Nevertheless, Ravn decided to repair the factory, which cost 8,000 rupees, while simultaneously requesting to resign, as his salary was too small. As such, Ravn resorted to unauthorized incomes, including leasing out vessels for voyages to Persia. Eventually, reports about his embezzlement and debt reached Tranquebar, and the later governor of Tranquebar, Rasmus Hansen Attrup, was appointed as the new opperhoved of Dannemarksnagore. Tranquebar's Privy Council (secrete råd) subsequently sent him to Dannemarksnagore, departing in September 1711 with two yachts to investigate the conditions caused by Ravn and receiving authority to arrest Ravn if necessary.

==== Arrest and deposition ====
Upon reaching Dannemarksnagore, Attrup found the colony in disorder, and Ravn was quickly exposed, being placed under citizen's arrest in a chamber in the factory by Attrup after Ravn tried to escape. Ravn was subsequently found guilty of being responsible for the loss of 6,128 rupees, which were used for excessive expenses, and he consequently had to pay 311 rupees to the D.E.I.C. Additionally, he was exposed for lying about the ships of the Company's cargo, and Attrup accordingly assumed the office on 1 October 1711.

=== Escape and sentence ===
Despite his arrest, Ravn managed to escape and fled to Madras, but was there handed over to the Danish captain of the ship Gyldenløve, who took Ravn back to Tranquebar on 20 June 1713. At Tranquebar, Ravn was quickly brought before the court, where his documents from Bengal were brought forth. Ravn did not answer questions regarding the main claims, and he was subsequently sentenced to life in prison at Bremerholm in Copenhagen.

Accordingly, Ravn is called an evil-minded man by his contemporaries, with Governor Johan Hassius claiming only God knew how much damage Ravn had caused. This view is also shared by historians, with Danish colonial historian Kay Larsen referring to him as having acted dishonestly and disorderly. Additionally, Indian historian Lalit Mohan Mitra called him incompetent and claimed he did little to further Danish trade in Dannemarksnagore.

Ravn was temporarily imprisoned at Fort Dansborg before being transported on the vessel Fredericus Quartus, which departed from Tranquebar on 28 October 1714.

== Personal life ==
Ravn was married in Tranquebar to Anna Jørgensdatter Larsen, who was the daughter of the chief of Tranquebar's garrison, Jørgen Larsen. Together, they had one son named Jørgen Wolff Ravn.

== See also ==
- Thomas Schmertz – Governor of Dannemarksnagore from 1699 to 1702
- Axel Juel – Governor of Dannemarksnagore from 1681 to 1686

== Notes and citations ==
=== References ===
- Larsen, Kay (1908). De dansk-ostindiske koloniers historie – De Bengalske loger & Nikobarerne [History of the Danish East Indian Colonies – The Bengali Lodges & the Nicobar Islands] (in Danish). Vol. 2. Copenhagen, Denmark: Centralforlaget – via Danskernes Historie Online.
- Larsen, Kay (1940). Guvernører, residenter, kommandanter og chefer [Governors, Residents, Commanders and Chiefs] (PDF) (in Danish). Copenhagen, Denmark: Arthur Jensens Forlag – via Danskernes Historie Online.
- Mitra, Lalit Mohan (September 1952). The Danes in Bengal (PDF) (1st ed.). Kolkata, India: Prabartak Publishers. p. 15 – via Internet Archive.
- Smith, Stefan Halikowski (31 December 2019). Lee, Christina; Schleck, Julia (eds.). Two missionary accounts of Southeast Asia in the late Seventeenth Century. Connected Histories in the Early Modern World. Leeds, UK: Arc Humanities Press. p. 166. ISBN 978-1641893183.
- Thankappan, Parameswaran Nair (1984). Calcutta in the 18th Century (1st ed.). Kolkata, India: Firma KLM Private Limited. p. 90 – via Internet Archive.
