= Christen Brun =

Christen Brun may refer to:

- Christen Brun (painter) (1828–1905), painter of altarpieces in Paulus Church, among others
- Christen Brun (bishop) (1846–1917), bishop of the Diocese of Hamar
- Christen Brun-Lundegaard (d. 1724), governor of Tranquebar
