= Siege of Dannemarksnagore (1707) =

1707 siege of a Danish colony in Bengal

- Part of the prelude to the Evacuation of Dannemarksnagore
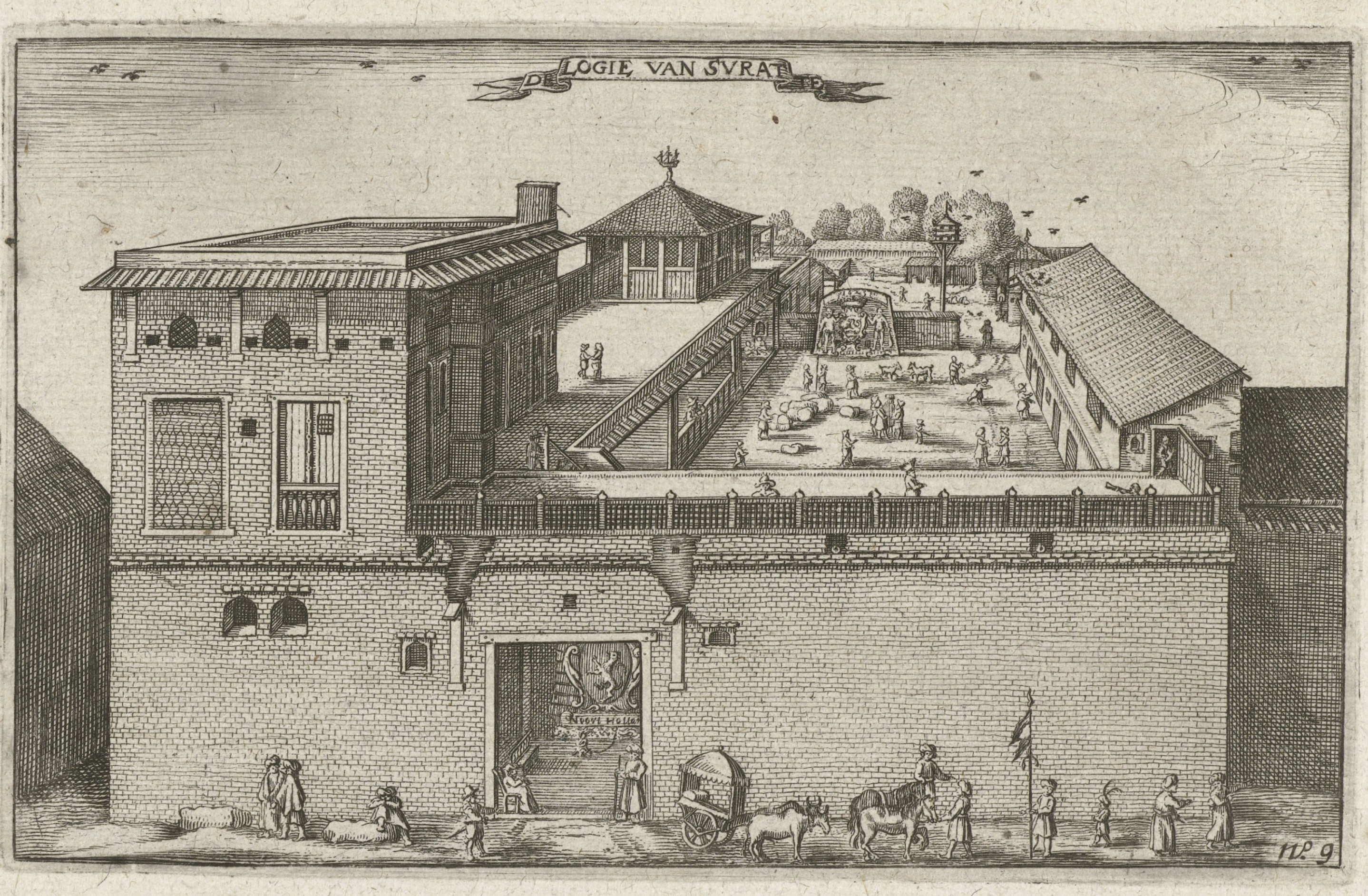
- Copperplate engraving of the Dutch factory in Surat, which was planned similarly to Dannemarksnagore
Date	1707
Location	Dannemarksnagore, Danish India (present-day Gondalpara, India) 22.8437634°N 88.3657193°E
Result	Inconclusive
Territorial changes	Status quo ante bellum

Belligerents
Mughal Empire; Bengal Subah	Danish India

Commanders and leaders
Azim-ush-Shan	(Danish India) Jacob Panck

Units involved
Unknown	(Danish India) Topass (Danish India) Factory garrison

Strength
Unknown	6 cannons Unknown no. of men (Note: Dannemarksnagore's garrison initially had c. 40 men.)

Casualties and losses
Unknown	Unknown

The siege of Dannemarksnagore took place in 1707 at the Danish colony of Dannemarksnagore in Bengal, between the Danes and the Mughal subahdar of Bengal, Azim-ush-Shan.

After owing money to local merchants, the Danish factory of Dannemarksnagore in Bengal was besieged by the Mughal Subahdar, Azim-ush-Shan, until the Danish governor, Jacob Panck, gave gifts to Azim-ush-Shan, making him lift the siege and subsequently sign a ceasefire.

== Background ==
The Danish factory of Dannemarksnagore in Bengal was built following the Dano-Mughal War in 1699. The Factory was expanded in the 1700s with warehouses and a tall curtain wall and was supplied with money and resources from the Danish colony of Tranquebar. However, the colony's initial governors were corrupt and practiced embezzlement, causing economic difficulties in the colony. As such, when Governor Johan Joachim Michelsen died in 1706, he had left behind large debts to local merchants, which they now demanded that the Danish East India Company should repay. Concurrently, the faujdar of Hooghly now demanded larger gifts from the Danes and raised the tariffs.

=== Prelude ===
Subsequently, the governor, Jacob Panck, started to fortify the factory, taking some Portuguese refugees in the D.E.I.C. service, before declining to repay Michelsen's debt until the colony got money from Tranquebar. Furthermore, he replaced a defensive earth bastion with a tall stone fortification, which he equipped with six cannons, and sought to put both personnel and the building in the best possible defensive state, despite the factory being in poor condition.

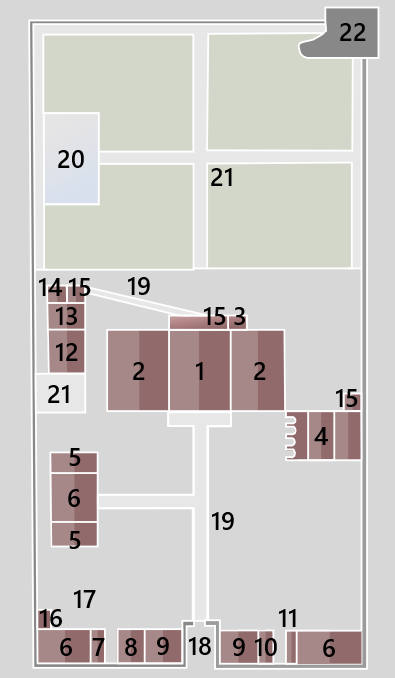
Plan of Dannemarksnagore from c. 1720 with the defensive bastion (22) at the top-right corner

== Siege ==
The Mughal subahdar of Bengal, Azim-ush-Shan, saw this as a dangerous escalation, and numerous other Danish wrongdoings now became relevant, prompting Azim-ush-Shan to initiate a siege of the factory. However, the siege was lifted after Governor Panck agreed to give him some gifts, and a ceasefire was established until further orders from Tranquebar reached the colony.

== Aftermath ==
In August 1707, Christen Brun-Lundegaard came from Tranquebar with two yachts, carrying money and goods with him. Brun-Lundegaard began negotiating with Michelsen's creditors, while Panck used the new resources to improve the factory. Nevertheless, hostilities continued in the following years, eventually leading to a Danish evacuation of the colony altogether in 1714.

== See also ==
- Siege of Tranquebar (1699) – 1699 siege of a European colony in India
- Attack in Hooghly – 1671 Danish attack on Bengali vessels in Hooghly
- Raid on Dannemarksnagore – 1713 raid of a Danish colony in Bengal

== Notes and citations ==
=== References ===
- Larsen, Kay (1940). Guvernører, residenter, kommandanter og chefer [Governors, Residents, Commanders and Chiefs] (PDF) (in Danish). Copenhagen, Denmark: Arthur Jensens Forlag – via Danskernes Historie Online.
- Larsen, Kay (1908). De dansk-ostindiske koloniers historie – De Bengalske loger & Nikobarerne [History of the Danish East Indian Colonies – The Bengali Lodges & the Nicobar Islands] (in Danish). Vol. 2. Copenhagen, Denmark: Centralforlaget – via Danskernes Historie Online.
- Larsen, Kay (1907). De dansk-ostindiske koloniers historie – Trankebar [History of the Danish East Indian Colonies – Tranquebar] (in Danish). Vol. 1. Copenhagen, Denmark: Centralforlaget – via Danskernes Historie Online.
- Nilsson, Sten Åke [in Swedish] (1968). European Architecture in India, 1750–1850. Translated by George, Agnes; Zettersten, Elenore (1st ed.). London: Faber & Faber. p. 98. ISBN 9780571082254.
