= Ulrik Christian Nissen =

Danish nobleman (1691–1756)

20th Governor of Tranquebar
- In office 21 January 1720 – 12 October 1726
- Monarch: Frederick IV
- Preceded by: Christen Brun-Lundegaard
- Succeeded by: Rasmus Hansen Attrup
Diocesan offices
Diocesan Governor of Aarhus
In office 31 January 1744 – 26 November 1746
Monarchs	Christian VI; Frederick V
Preceded by	Jacob Benzon
Succeeded by	Hans Frederik Levetzau
7th Diocesan Governor of Trondhjem
In office 9 April 1736 – 1744
Monarch	Christian VI
Preceded by	Jacob Benzon
Succeeded by	Christian de Stockfleth
County officies
10th County Governor of Copenhagen
In office 7 November 1752 – 17 October 1756
Monarch	Frederick V
Preceded by	Christian Siegfried von Plessen
Succeeded by	Jens Krag-Juel-Vind
5th County Governor of Trondhjem
In office 9 April 1736 – 1744
Monarch	Christian VI
Preceded by	Jacob Benzon
Succeeded by	Christian de Stockfleth
County Governor of Havreballegaard
In office 31 January 1744 – 26 November 1746
Monarchs	Christian VI; Frederick V
Preceded by	Jacob Benzon
Succeeded by	Hans Frederik Levetzau
County Governor of Stjernholm
In office 31 January 1744 – 26 November 1746
Monarchs	Christian VI; Frederick V
Preceded by	Jacob Benzon
Succeeded by	Hans Frederik Levetzau

Personal details
- Born: 1691 Denmark–Norway
- Died: 17 October 1756 (aged 64–65) Copenhagen, Denmark–Norway
- Relations: Christian Siegfried Nissen-Benzon (brother)

Ulrik Christian von Nissen-Benzon to Skjersø (Note: Danish pronunciation: [ulʁɛg kʁɛsdjan fɔn nesən bɛnsɒn]) (alternatively spelled Ulrich and Kristian; 1691 – 17 October 1756) was a Danish nobleman and administrator.

Nissen was born in Denmark–Norway in 1691 and became Hofjunker in 1716. He was appointed as commander and opperhoved of the Danish colony of Tranquebar in 1718, in which he served until 1726. Upon returning home, Nissen became an Etatsråd in 1729 and from 1736 to 1744 diocesan governor (stiftamtmand) and county governor of the Diocese of Trondhjem and Trondhjem County, respectively. Additionally, he served as diocesan governor of the Diocese of Aarhus and amtmand of Havreballegård County and Stjernholm County from 1747 to 1752, when he became amtmand of Copenhagen County.

He took the name Benzon in 1754 after acquiring the stamhus (an entailed estate) of Skjersø. He died in Copenhagen on 17 October 1756, aged 64 to 65.

== Early life ==
Ulrik Christian Nissen was born in Denmark–Norway in 1691 to the nobleman, Herman Lorenz Nissen, and Ida Sofie Amalie Glud. His father was an etatsråd and amtsforvalter (a regional economic official) in Segeberg County, while his mother was the daughter of Bishop Søren Glud. In 1716, Ulrik Nissen became hofjunker (young nobleman who serves in the court).

== Governor of Tranquebar ==
On 11 September 1718, Nissen was appointed as commander and opperhoved of the Danish colony of Tranquebar. He departed from Denmark on the ship Jomfru Susanna in December the same year, reaching Tranquebar in early 1720 after encountering difficulties at the Cape of Good Hope. On 21 January 1720, the Governor, Christen Brun-Lundegaard, resigned, and Nissen's administration assumed the governorship during the following days.

=== Tariff policies ===
As governor, Nissen issued a customs tariff on 5 August 1721, whereby import and export duties on the seaward side of the colony were fixed. Additionally, from the customs house, anchorage fees and weighing fees were levied on all vessels except those of the Danish East India Company. As Mughal merchants conducted the majority of the coastal trade, attempts were made to attract them by granting reductions in duties for unloading and loading in the roadstead of Tranquebar. At the same time, the Mughal merchants who wished to pass through the coast of the town were compelled to purchase a sea passport (sø-pas), which cost 5-600 rupees per year. The D.E.I.C.'s armed ships inspected all Mughal vessels to the best of their ability; however, in 1720, two ships were detained for having violated the Danish regulations, but were quickly released by the colony's Privy Council (secrete råd).

Concurrently, the colony's treasury was depleted of funds, and the Privy Council did not want to expose itself to new complications. The small vessels that engaged in the regional trade were in very poor condition, and it was difficult to maintain commercial communication between Tranquebar and the Sunda Islands. Additionally, the Danish factory in Oddeway Torre was lost after a dispute with the local authorities, and trade on the Malabar Coast was temporarily abandoned. In 1725, the conditions were so bad that the Company was close to dissolving. Meanwhile, Nissen returned to Denmark–Norway on 22 October 1726 on board the Grev Laurvig with all his possessions, while transferring the governorate to Rasmus Hansen Attrup on 12 October 1726, who was the former governor of Dannemarksnagore.

== Later life as county governor ==
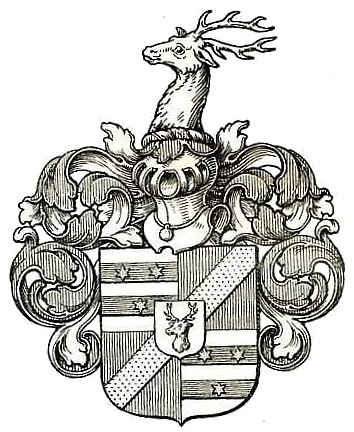
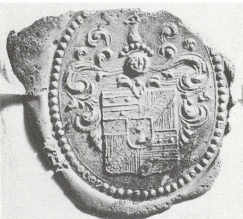
Coat of arms of the Nissen-Benzon family (top) and Ulrik Christian Nissen's personal seal (bottom)

Upon returning home, Nissen received the title of Etatsråd on 11 October 1729. From 9 April 1736 to 1744, he was diocesan governor (stiftamtmand) of the Diocese of Trondhjem and county governor of Trondhjem County. Followingly, on 31 January 1744, Nissen became a member of the naval Generalkrigskommisariat. He was dismissed on 26 November 1746, as the institution merged with the Admiralty Court (Admiralitetskollegiet), although keeping his full salary for some time in compensation.

On 26 June 1747, Nissen became diocesan governor of the Diocese of Aarhus and amtmand of Havreballegård County and Stjernholm County, where he served until 7 November 1752, when he became amtmand of Copenhagen County. Nissen was additionally an assessor in the Danish Supreme Court from 1744 to 1756.

On 4 September 1747, Nissen became a Knight of the Dannebrog with the motto: "Grace will come at an unexpected hour" (Latin: Gratia superveniet, quæ non sperabitur hora). Additionally, he received the stamhus (entailed estate) of Skjersø on 1 May 1755, after a compromise with his cousin on 10 December 1754. Subsequently, he took the name Benzon as a part of the compromise. (Note: According to the rules of the stamhus, every owner had to add the name Benzon to their own surname.)

Nissen died unmarried on 17 October 1756 (Note: Other sources say 15 October 1756.) in Copenhagen.

== See also ==
- Sivert Adeler – Danish captain and colonial administrator (1647–1683)
- Johan Sigismund Hassius – Governor of Tranquebar from 1704 to 1716

== Notes and references ==
=== Works cited ===
- Teisen, J. V.; Bobé, Louis [in Danish] (1927). Danmarks Adels Aarbog 1927 [Yearbook of the Danish nobility] (PDF). Danmarks Adels Aarbog (in Danish). Illustrations by Friedrich Britze. Copenhagen: J.H. Schultz Publishing.
- Nissen, Gunnar Brun; Nissen, Harald (1978). Slægten Nissen fra Bov sogn [The Nissen family from Bov parish] (PDF) (in Norwegian and English). Trondheim: self-published.
- Rosenkrantz, Palle [in Danish] (1936). Amtmandsbogen [The Governor's Book] (PDF) (in Danish). Copenhagen: Arthur Jensens Forlag. p. 116.
- Bricka, Carl Frederik; et al. (Kringelbach, George) (1898). Dansk biografisk lexikon [Danish biographical dictionary] (in Danish). Vol. 12. Copenhagen: Gyldendal. p. 303.
- Weidling, Tor [in Norwegian] (2000). Eneveldets menn i Norge [Men of the absolutism in Norway] (PDF). Rigsarkivaren skriftserie (in Norwegian). Vol. 7. Oslo: Messel Forlag. ISBN 82-548-0065-0.
- Krogh, Ferdinand [in Danish] (1868). De danske majorater [The Danish Manors] (in Danish). Copenhagen: Chr. Steen & Søn. p. 312.
- Larsen, Kay (1940). Guvernører, Residenter, Kommandanter og Chefer [Governors, Residents, Commanders and Chiefs] (PDF) (in Danish). Copenhagen: Arthur Jensens Forlag.
- Larsen, Kay (1907). De dansk-ostindiske Koloniers Historie [History of the Danish East Indian Colonies] (in Danish). Copenhagen: Centralforlaget.
- Andrup, Otto (1946). Vaabenførende Slægter i Danmark [Arms-bearing Families in Denmark] (PDF) (in Danish). Vol. 3. Copenhagen: Heraldisk Forlag.
- Barfod, Frederik [in Danish] (1877). Lavrits Ulrik la Cour og Ellen Kirstine Poulsen (PDF) (in Danish). Copenhagen: self-published. p. 116.
