= List of governors of Danish India =

The Governor of Tranquebar (Danish: Guvernører af Trankebar) was a title typically given for the leadership of Danish India from 1620 – 1845. The title of leader of Tranquebar has had various names throughout history like overhoved, president or commander.

== List ==
=== Governors of Tranquebar ===
List of governors of Tranquebar
No.	Image	Name (Birth–Death)	Tenure			Events
No.	Image	Name (Birth–Death)	Start	End	Duration	Events
1		Ove Gjedde (27 December 1594 – 19 December 1660)	11 October 1620	13 February 1621	125 days	Ove Gjedde's Expedition; Action of 19 February 1619; Ambush at Portudal; Conquest of Koneswaram Temple; Tranquebar Treaty of 1620; Establishment of Tranquebar
2		Roland Crappé	13 February 1621	1636	≥ 14 years, 322 days	Roland Crappé's raids on Portuguese colonies; Siege of Dansborg (1624); Grounding of the Jupiter; Grounding of the Nattergalen
3		Bernt Pessart	1636	1643	≥ 7 years	Start of the Dano-Mughal War; Mirza Mumin's assault; Grounding of the St. Jacob; Capture of Den Bengalske Prise; Expulsion of Danes from Balasore
4		Willem Leyel	1643	1648	≥ 5 years	Conflict between Willem Leyel and Bernt Pessart; Skirmish of Narsapur Road; Action off Pipli River; Capture of Den Lille Elefant; Willem Leyel's siege of Dansborg; Capture of the St. Michael; Danish rescue mission to Pipli; Battle of Balasore; Willem Leyel's war on Golconda; Tranquebar Rebellion
5		Poul Hansen Korsør	1648	1655	≥ 7 years	Tried selling Tranquebar to the Dutch and the Margraviate of Brandenburg
6		Eskild Andersen Kongsbakke	1655	1674	≥ 19 years	Sieges of Tranquebar (1655–1669); Renewed Dano-Mughal War
7		Henrik Eggers	1669	1673	≥ 4 years	
8		Sivert Adeler	1673	1682	≥ 9 years	Made temporary peace with the Mughal Empire
9		Axel Juel	8 October 1681	9 July 1686	4 years, 274 days	Blockade of Porto Novo
10		Wolff Heinrich von Calnein	9 July 1686	October 1687	≥ 1 year, 84 days	Renewed Dano-Mughal War; Arrest attempt of Jørgen Bjørn
11		Christian Porck	October 1687	1689	≥ 1 year, 92 days	
12		Moritz Hartmann	22 April 1690	30 September 1690	161 days	
13		Christian Porck	1690	1694	≥ 4 years	Improved Tranquebar's fortifications
14		Claus Vogdt	1694	19 May 1701	≥ 7 years, 138 days	Dano-Mughal Treaty; Siege of Tranquebar (1699)
15		Andreas Andræ	19 May 1701	1701	≥ 226 days	
16		Mikkel Knudsen Crone	1701	1702	≥ 1 year	
17		Jørgen Bjørn	July 1702	12 June 1704	≥ 1 year, 347 days	Improved Tranquebar's fortifications
18		Johan Sigismund Hassius	1 July 1704	20 October 1716	12 years, 111 days	Start of the Tranquebar Mission; Zion Church is erected
19		Christen Brun-Lundegaard	20 October 1716	21 January 1720	3 years, 93 days	New Jerusalem Church is erected
20		Ulrik Christian Nissen	21 January 1720	12 October 1726	6 years, 264 days	Harsh tariff policies inacted
21		Rasmus Hansen Attrup	12 October 1726	8 August 1730	3 years, 300 days	
22		Diderich Mühlenport	8 August 1730	1 August 1733	2 years, 358 days	
23		Poul Krisk Panck	1 August 1733	13 July 1741	7 years, 346 days	
24		Ivar Bonsack	13 July 1741	17 September 1744	3 years, 66 days	
25		Hans Ernst Bonsack	17 September 1744	5 September 1754	9 years, 353 days	
26		Hans Georg Krog	5 September 1754	10 August 1759	4 years, 339 days	
27		Christian Frederik Høyer	9 May 1759	4 July 1760	1 year, 56 days	
28		Herman Jacob Forck	4 July 1760	27 April 1761	297 days	
29		Hermann Abbestée	27 April 1761	14 February 1775	13 years, 293 days	
30		David Brown	14 February 1775	17 January 1779	3 years, 337 days	
31		Hermann Abbestée	17 January 1779	17 May 1788	9 years, 121 days	
32		Peter Anker	17 May 1788	7 February 1806	17 years, 266 days	Capture of Tranquebar (1801); Capture of Serampore (1801); Plunder of Nancowry
33		Johan Peter Hermannson	7 February 1806	13 February 1808	2 years, 6 days	Surrender of Tranquebar (1808); Capture of Serampore (1808)
English occupation (13 february 1808 – 20 September 1815)
34		Gerhard Sievers Bille	20 September 1815	19 November 1816	1 year, 60 days	
35		Johan Peter Hermannson	19 November 1816	15 February 1822	5 years, 88 days	
36		Jens Kofoed	16 February 1822	7 May 1823	1 year, 80 days	
37		Ulrich Anton Schönheyde	7 May 1823	7 March 1825	1 year, 304 days	
38		Hans de Brinck-Seidelin	7 March 1825	26 March 1829	4 years, 19 days	
39		Lauritz Christensen	26 March 1829	14 May 1832	3 years, 49 days	
40		Conrad Emil Mourier	17 May 1832	11 May 1838	5 years, 359 days	
41		Johannes Rehling	11 May 1838	18 June 1841	3 years, 38 days	
42		Christian Tiemroth	18 June 1841	15 September 1841	89 days	
43		Peder Hansen	16 October 1841	7 November 1845	4 years, 22 days	Danish India is sold to the British Empire

=== Governors of Dannemarksnagore ===
List of governors of Dannemarksnagore
No.	Name (Birth–Death)	Tenure			Events
No.	Name (Birth–Death)	Start	End	Duration	Events
1	Andreas Andræ (d. 1701)	1698	January 1699	≥ 1 year	Dano-Mughal Treaty; Establishment of Dannemarksnagore
2	Thomas Schmertz (d. 1708)	January 1699	26 July 1702	3 years, 206 days	More warehouses and a curtain wall is erected
3	Johan Joachim Michelsen (d. 1706)	26 July 1702	28 October 1706	4 years, 94 days	Collaboration with Armenians; Attempted Dano-Persian treaty
4	Jacob Panck (d. 1719)	28 October 1706	3 September 1709	3 years, 39 days	Siege of Dannemarksnagore
5	Wolff Ravn	3 September 1709	1 October 1711	2 years, 28 days	Factory is decaying
6	Rasmus Attrup	1 October 1711	December 1714	3 years, 61 days	Raid on Dannemarksnagore; Evacuation of Dannemarksnagore
7	Gallus Bøgvad	1718	1721	≥ 3 years	Short reestablishment of Dannemarksnagore

=== Governors of Frederiknagore ===
List of governors of Serampore (Danish: Frederiknagore)
Tenure	Incumbent	Notes
1755–1758	Christian Soetmann	
1758–1760	Bartholomæus Ziegenbalg	Son of Bartholomäus Ziegenbalg
1760–1762	Terkel Windekilde	
1762–1765	Demarchis	
1765–1767	Mogens Tyrholm	
1767–1768	Michael Thede	
1768–1770	Charles Cazeuove	
1770	James Brown	
1770	Herman Hinckel	
1770–1772	Johan Leonhard Fix	1st term
1772	Ole Bie	1st term
1772–1773	Johan Leonhard Fix	2nd term
1773–1776	Andreas Hiernøe	
1776–1785	Ole Bie	2nd term
1785–1788	Friedrich le Fevre	
1788–1797	Ole Bie	3rd term
1797–1799	Peter Hermanson	
1799	Jacob Kræfting	1st term
1799–1805	Ole Bie	4th term
1805–1828	Jacob Kræfting	2nd term
1828–1833	Johannes Hohlenberg	
1833–1835	Johan Boeck	
1835–1838	Johannes Rehling	
1838–1845	Peder Hansen	Colony sold to Britain in 1845

== See also ==
- List of governors of the Danish West Indies
- List of colonial governors of the Danish Gold Coast – Chronological list of colonial governors that ruled the Danish colony on the Gold Coast
- Danish India – Former settlements and trading posts of Denmark and Norway on the Indian subcontinent
