= HDMS Fridericus Quartus =

Danish warship (1699–1736)

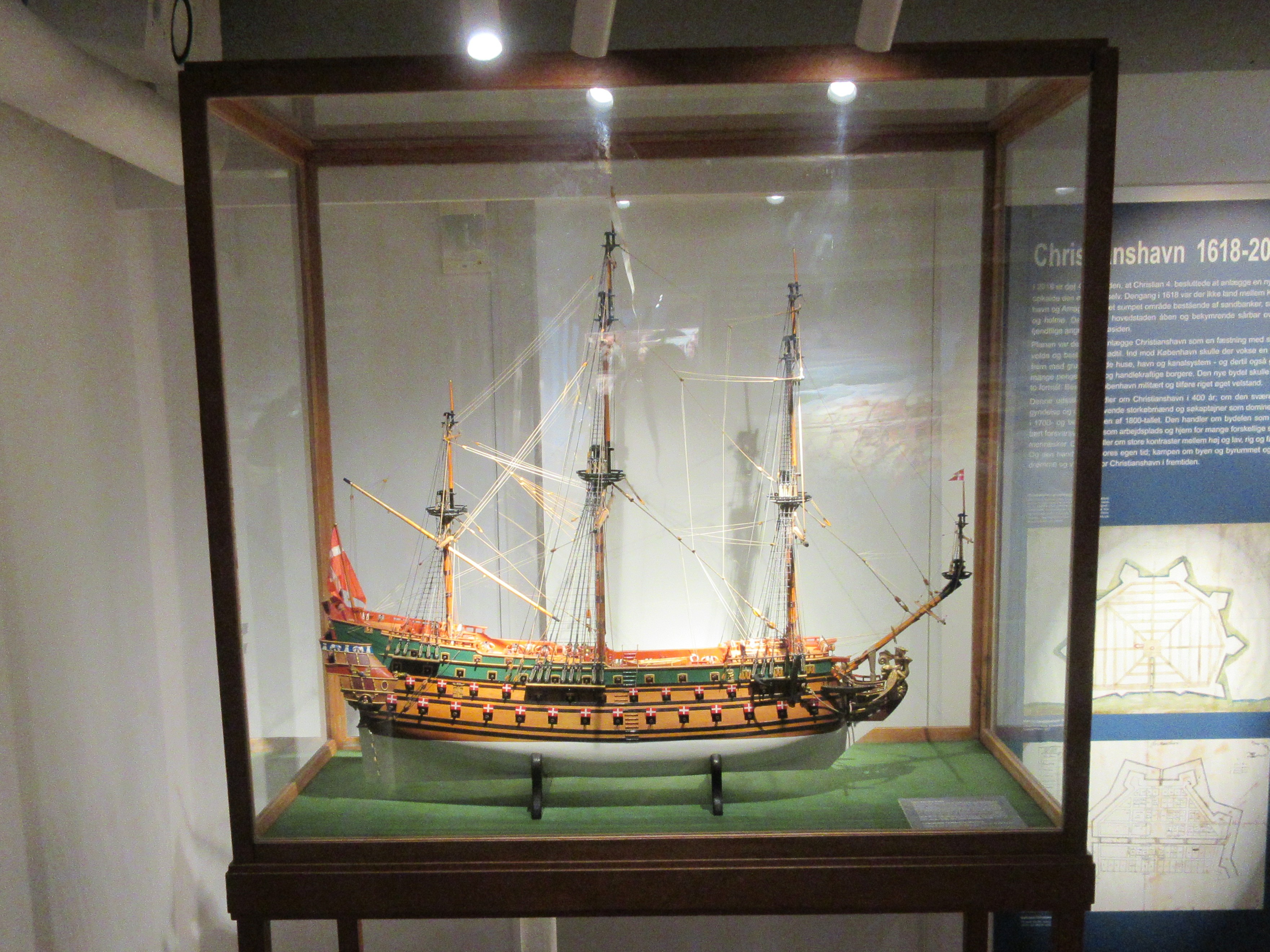
A model of Fridericus Quartus on display in the Heering House in Copenhagen.

HDMS Fridericus Quartus (also spelled Fredericus Quartus), launched at Royal Danish Naval Dockyards in 1699, was a three-deck, 110-gun ship of the line designed to be the flagship of the Royal Dano-Norwegian Navy. She soon proved difficult to navigate, and unsuited for the shallow Danish waters. She was later used as an East Indiaman, first by the Danish East India Company and then by the Danish Asiatic Company. She was wrecked at Skagen in November 1736, shortly after embarking on her second DAC expedition to Tranquebar. She co-existed with another ship by the same name, a slave ship owned by the Danish West India Company, which wrecked off Costa Rica's coast in 1710.

== Construction ==
The fleet of the Dano-Norwegian Navy was significantly increased in the late 17th century, mainly due to Denmark-Norway's struggle with Sweden for control of the Baltic Sea. In 1699, Jens Juel was put in charge of the endeavour. The plans comprised a new flag ship, Store Christianus Quintus ("Great Christianus Quintus"), with 90 guns, which would become the 10th ship constructed at the new Nyholm Dockyards. The plans were later modified to 110 guns. Ole Judichær was in charge of the construction. The ship was laid down in early 1699. It had still not been launched when the king died in August the same year, The name was therefore changed to Fredericus Quartus, after the new king, Frederick IV. Fredericus Quartus was launched on 19 December 1699. Her design was based on that of the French ship of the line Royal Louis /built 1692). On a test voyage, on 26 June 1701, she ran aground on a sand bar southeast of Dragør. The site became known as Quartusgrunden.

Fridericus Quartus was a 1st-rate three-decker. She was 155 ft (47 m) long, with a beam of 50 ft (15 m) and a draught of 20 ft 2 in (6.15 m). Her complement was 950 men. Her armament was 100 36-pounder guns.

== Career ==
=== Naval service ===
Fridericus Quartus was commissioned by the Royal Dano-Norwegian Navy in 1701. She soon proved poorly navigable. Her lower gundeck was unusable when at sea in windy conditions

=== Danish East India Company ===
Fridericus Quartus was transferred to the Danish East India Company. She arrived at Tranquebar on 31 June 1704. Johan Sigismund Hassius Lillienpalm was among the passengers.

She sailed on another expedition to Danish India in 1705–06.

She sailed on another expedition to Danish India in 1708–10. A young Peter Tordenskiold was part of the crew on the 1708-10 expedition. He served as 3rd mate (trediestyrmand) on the return trip.

In August 1711, she was badly damaged by a fire that claimed two lives. She was not repaired until 1717, but without going back into active service.

Fridericus Quartus was sent on a third expedition to Danish India in 1713-14. She reached Tranquebar on 14 February 1714. Gallus Bøgvad, who had just been employed as a FAC assistant, was among the passengers. He would later serve as governor of Dannemarksnagore.

Fridericus Quartus set sail from Tranquebar on 28 October 1714. Wolff Ravn was sent to Copenhagen as a prisoner.

Fridericus Quartus sailed to Atschins in 1728 (Hans Ernst Bonsach was an assistant).

=== DAC career ===
On 28 January 1733, Fridericus Quartus was sold to the newly established Danish Asiatic Company for 7,500 rigsdaler. .Grev Laurvig, Vendela and Kronprinsen af Danmark were also Transferred from the Danish East India Company to the Danish Asiatic Company.

Fridericus Quartus departed from Copenhagen in 1733, bound for Tranquebar. She carried a cargo with a total value of 90,000 rigsdaler, consisting of silver (84.986 rigsdaler, 94%), other metals (4.084 rigsdaler), wine and alcohol (811 rigsdaler), ship components (118 rigsdaler) and "other goods" (1 Rigsdaler).

Fridericus Quartus arrived at Tranquebar on 8 October 1734. Her cargo was sold for 98.997 rigsdaler. She departed from Tranquebar on 1 February 1735. She saluted Kronborg on 3 November 1735, marking her safe return. The total travel time was thus 632 days. The DAC's share of the return cargo was sold at auction for 163.693.

== Fate ==
On 17 October 1736, under command of Capt. Claus Munckenberg, bound for Tranquebar. Fridericus Quartus saluted Kronborg to mark the beginning of what would become her last voyage. She was wrecked off Skagen. Her cargo was subsequently sent to Tranquebar with Kronprinsen af Danmark in 1738.

A model of the ship is on display in the Heering House in Copenhagen. Another model of the ship hangs in Mårslet Church in Jutland. The ship is also seen on a 1951 stamp commemorating the 250th anniversary of the Danish Naval Academy.
