= Jørgen Bjørn =

Governor of Tranquebar from 1702 to 1704

17th Governor of Tranquebar
- In office July 1702 – 12 June 1704
- Monarch: Frederick IV
- Preceded by: Mikkel Knudsen Crone
- Succeeded by: Johan Sigismund Hassius

Personal details
- Born: 1652 Copenhagen, Denmark–Norway
- Died: 12 June 1704 (aged 51–52) Tranquebar, Danish India
- Spouse(s): Margrethe Dahl (m. 1675, divorced) Anna Lauritsdatter Uddal (m. 1699)
- Children: 4-6

Military service
- Allegiance: Denmark–Norway
- Branch/service: Royal Danish Navy
- Years of service: 1671–1701
- Rank: Schoutbynacht
- Battles/wars: Battle of Heligoland; Dano-Mughal War; Arrest attempt of Jørgen Bjørn

Jørgen Hermandsen Bjørn (Note: Danish pronunciation: [jœɐ̯n haɐ̯mansən bjœɐ̯n]) (1652 – 12 June 1704) was a Danish captain and governor of Tranquebar from July 1702 to his death on 12 June 1704.

Bjørn was born in Copenhagen in 1652 and went to sea at the age of 16. In 1671, he entered the Danish navy and became a captain in 1682, participating in the conquest of Heligoland in 1684. The following year, he went to Danish India, possibly conducting privateering against the Mughals, and returned in 1687. During the return voyage, he became involved in a conflict with Governor Wolf Henrik von Kalnein, who wanted to arrest Bjørn. After a short armed encounter, Bjørn's ship left the fleet and returned to Copenhagen alone.

In 1701, he was appointed Governor of Danish India and reached the Danish colony of Tranquebar in July 1702. Notwithstanding, he governed with great authority and caused trade to decline. Consequently, he was replaced by Johan Sigismund Hassius on 31 June 1704, but had already died on 12 June.

== Early career ==
Jørgen Hermandsen Bjørn was born in Copenhagen in 1652. He was the son of a sailmaker and compassmaker at Bremerholm, Herman Bjørn (or Bjørnssøn), and Birgitte Lygtemager Bjørn, daughter of the Danish vice admiral, Jørgen Bjørnsen.

At the age of 16, he went to sea and in 1671 became a naval cadet. In 1673, he became a Lieutenant and was on board the vessel Hvide Falk in the following year under the command of Christian Bielke. Hereafter, Bjørn conducted merchant shipping in India for eight years. Bjørn became Captain of the 3rd Class in 1682 and received many commands, including commanding the frigate Tumleren in 1684 during the conquest of Heligoland.

== Captain of Antoinetta ==
In 1685, Bjørn became Captain of 2nd Class and got a sea passport (sø-pas) as captain of Antoinetta on 19 September of the same year. Together with the Governor of Tranquebar, Wolf Henrik von Kalnein, on the Flyvende Ulv, Antoinetta sailed for Danish India on 7 October, reaching the Danish colony of Tranquebar on 12 July 1686.

It is possible that Bjørn partook in the Dano-Mughal War with Antoinetta, capturing a prize renamed Gyldenløve.

On 11 October 1687, Bjørn returned to Copenhagen from Tranquebar with Flyvende Ulv, Gyldenløve, and the yacht Haabet. During the return voyage, Bjørn became increasingly more in conflict with Wolf Henrik von Kalnein: once reaching the Cape of Good Hope, Bjørn was berated by von Kalnein in front of the entire crew. The fleet left the Cape of Good Hope on 27 January 1688, reaching Ascension Island on 29 February. Here, the relationship between Bjørn and von Kalnein completely deteriorated: von Kalnein summoned Bjørn to Flyvende Ulv; however, upon warnings that von Kalnein would arrest Bjørn, the latter excused himself and remained on board Antoinetta. In response, von Kalnein sent two vessels with armed men to Antoinetta, but they were quickly driven away after a short encounter.

Subsequently, the ship council on Antoinetta resolved to make the ship ready for sailing in case of attack. Again on 5 March, the ship council decided to leave the fleet and go directly to Copenhagen. Antoinetta reached Copenhagen on 19 June 1688, but Bjørn initially refrained from complaining about von Kalnein.

== Governor of Tranquebar ==
On 2 June 1691, Bjørn received the office of Commander of Dansborg by royal decree, but was quickly dismissed on 7 October. However, shortly thereafter, a different decision was made regarding him. In 1694, he became the commanding captain of the frigate Søhunden, which he saved during a storm in the Texel roadstead through his seamanship. Furthermore, he was appointed head of the shipyard in Christianssand, Norway, in 1699, but stepped down on 5 April 1701.

On 17 September 1701, he was appointed as the Governor of Danish India by the Danish East India Company. Consequently, he left the Danish navy on 20 September and instead became schoutbynacht in November. It is not known why Bjørn was chosen as governor; nonetheless, it is likely that his wealthy father-in-law, Laurits Andersen Undal, who was a shareholder in the D.E.I.C., may have influenced this decision.

Upon his arrival at Tranquebar in July 1702, he intervened authoritatively in all affairs, abolishing the old ceremonial military honors for secretaries and officers, so that no one received any respect except himself, who retained a military escort of one lower officer (underofficer), six white soldiers, and eight to ten talliarer (sepoys from present-day Thirunallar). Accordingly, Jørgen Bjørn set about enjoying to the full extent the benefits his position offered: in particular, he was keen on exploiting the Indian custom of giving gifts on festive occasions, such as when applying for offices and "thank-you visits." The Danish officers kept everything in the old routine and were left undisturbed in their own affairs. Despite this, many of them felt that Bjørn put his own interests before theirs and the company's. Concurrently, Bjørn increased his private fortune, while his wife, Anna Uddal, (Note: Some older sources erroneously identify Bjørn's wife as "Anna Dahl". It is possible that the 18th-century historian, Johan Henrik Lützow, had confused Anna Uddal with Bjørn's earlier wife, Margrethe Dahl.) ensured that the Government House became the center of social life.

Bjørn continued the fortification works on Fort Dansborg, so that in 1704, the so-called ravelinen (fortified island) was finished. Nevertheless, trade got worse everywhere, especially on the Malabar Coast, where trade almost completely ceased for a period. This was soon noticed by the company management in Copenhagen, who therefore decided to elect Johan Sigismund Hassius as the new governor and bring Bjørn home. Hassius reached Tranquebar on 31 June 1704; however, Bjørn had already died on 12 June.

== Personal life ==
Jørgen Bjørn was married twice: first in 1675 to Margrethe Dahl and second to Anna Lauritsdatter Uddal in c. 1699. He had three to four children in his first marriage, and is mentioned as a father on 12 April 1684 in Holmen Church.

He remarried in c. 1699 in Christianssand with Anna Lauritsdatter Uddal. Together, they had Jørgen Bjørn (born 29 September 1704 in Tranquebar), but also raised other non-biological children, including Anne Sophie Jørgensdatter (b. 1 July 1691 in Copenhagen). Additionally, a number of later sources talk of a certain Anna Cathrina, claimed to be born in Tranquebar in 1703, which could be a biological daughter of Jørgen Bjørn. Furthermore, Norwegian genealogist Erik Andreas Thomle claims that Jørgen Bjørn and Anna Uddal had a second child, named Margrethe Bjørn.

After Bjørn's death in 1704, Anna Uddal became notably wealthy and remained in Tranquebar. She remarried in 1707 to the new governor of Tranquebar, Johan Sigismund Hassius, who received much of her wealth.

== See also ==
- Claus Vogdt – Governor of Tranquebar from 1694 to 1701
- Moritz Hartmann (officer) – 1657–1695 Danish naval officer and governor of Danish India
- Sivert Adeler – Danish captain and colonial administrator (1647–1683)

== Works cited ==
- Larsen, Kay (1940). Guvernører, Residenter, Kommandanter og Chefer (PDF) (in Danish). Copenhagen: Arthur Jensens Forlag.
- Larsen, Kay (1907). De dansk-ostindiske Koloniers Historie [History of the Danish East Indian Colonies] (in Danish). Copenhagen: Centralforlaget.
- Christensen, Bernhard (2021). Om min grønlandske familie [About my Greenlandic family] (PDF) (in Danish). self-published.
- Thomle, Erik Andreas (1906). Personhistorisk tidsskrift [Journal of personal history] (in Danish). Vol. 27. Harvard University: Samfundet for dansk genealogi og personalhistorie.
- Klitgaard, Carl (1918). Kjærulfske studier [Kjærulfian studies] (PDF) (in Danish). Schultz Forlag. p. 215.
- Engevold, Per Ivar (2022). Nordmenn i slavefart [Norwegians in the slave trade] (in Norwegian). Humanist Forlag.
- Bricka, Carl Frederik (1887). Dansk biografisk lexikon [Danish biographical dictionary] (in Danish). Copenhagen: Gyldendal. p. 290.
- Rise, Hansen (2011). Sources of the History of North Africa, Asia and Oceania in Denmark. De Gruyter. p. 59.
- Thomle, Erik Andreas (1888). Personhistorisk tidsskrift [Journal of personal history] (PDF) (in Danish). Vol. 3. Copenhagen: Samfundet for dansk genealogi og personalhistorie.
- Bricka, Carl Frederik (1905). Dansk biografisk lexikon [Danish biographical dictionary] (in Danish). Vol. 19. Gyldendal. p. 430.
- Lützow, Johan Henrik [in Danish] (1788). Historiske Efterretninger om Danske Søe-officierer [Historic information about Danish naval officers] (PDF) (in Danish). Vol. 1. Copenhagen: Johan Frederik Schultz.
