= Christen Brun-Lundegaard =

Governor of Tranquebar from 1716 to 1720

19th Governor of Tranquebar
- In office 20 October 1716 – 21 January 1720
- Monarch: Frederick IV
- Preceded by: Johan Sigismund Hassius
- Succeeded by: Ulrik Christian Nissen

Personal details
- Born: Unknown Denmark–Norway
- Died: 24 January 1724 Tranquebar, Danish India
- Spouses: Wibeke Chrislensdatter Berg (m. 1714; died 1723); Utilia Elisabeth Rafn (m. 1723)

Christen Brun-Lundegaard (Note: Danish pronunciation: [kʁɛsdən bʁu:n lɔndəgɒ]) (alternatively spelled Christian and Bruun; died 24 January 1724) was a Danish colonial official and governor of Tranquebar from 20 October 1716 to 21 January 1720.

Brun-Lundegaard started as an assistant of the Danish East India Company in the Danish colony of Tranquebar. In 1707, he came to Bengal as an accountant (revideur), but returned to Tranquebar the following year. Upon returning, Brun-Lundegaard advanced as treasurer and subaccountant (underbogholder) in 1708 and became chief accountant (overbogholder) in 1711.

Continuing in 1714, he became sekonde (second-in-command) of the colony's Privy Council (secrete råd) and was appointed governor of Tranquebar in 1716, following the dismissal of Governor Johan Sigismund Hassius. During his tenure, the previous Danish factory in Bengal, Dannemarksnagore, was reestablished, while the relationship with the Danish-Halle Mission improved. Despite this, Brun-Lundegaard resigned as governor in 1720 in favor of Ulrik Christian Nissen.

Brun-Lundegaard died on 24 January 1724 in Tranquebar after a long illness.

== Early career ==
Christen Brun-Lundegaard began his career in the Danish East India Company as an assistant in the Danish colony of Tranquebar. In 1703, he undertook a voyage to Malacca as a ship’s assistant aboard the vessel, Printz Christian. By order of the company management, he was appointed secretary to the colony's Privy Council (secrete råd) on 1 July 1704. In the same year, he was accused of irregularities during the previous voyage to Malacca, but was acquitted by the court.

On 20 July 1707, Brun-Lundegaard was sent with the yachts Gyldenløve and Fortuna to the Danish factory, Dannemarksnagore, in Bengal, as an accountant (revideur) for the current officials and as a commissioner. He arrived at the factory in August 1707, bringing money and resources to the colony and began his work, negotiating with the factory's and earlier governor, Johan Joachim Michelsen's, creditors and confiscating the latter's belongings. As such, Michelsen's creditors were mostly repaid, while Brun-Lundegaard developed the colony's trade so that when he departed again in February 1708, he had left behind money sufficient for one year to the governor, Jacob Panck. Simultaneously, he brought saltpeter, silk, and textiles with him back to Tranquebar, which he returned to on 14 March 1708. Upon returning, he was installed as lower merchant (underkøbmand) and became both treasurer and subaccountant (underbogholder) on 8 October and 27 October 1708, respectively.

Brun-Lundegaard is described as having been a diligent, capable, and trusted man. Consequently, as the colony needed his capabilities as subaccountant, his multiple requests for permission to repatriate were rejected. When his request for an increased salary was also rejected, he applied on 9 October 1710 in a more determined manner for permission to return home, but was persuaded to stay as he was promised career advancement. Subsequently, he became chief accountant (overbogholder) and third-in-command of the Privy Council on 12 May 1711, and as he had served the Company for 15 years, he received an increase in his salary. Furthermore, he advanced to sekonde (second-in-command) of the Privy Council at the end of 1714, likely due to the governor of Tranquebar, Johan Sigismund Hassius's, favor.

== Governor of Tranquebar ==
After Johan Sigismund Hassius's dismissal as governor, he installed Brun-Lundegaard as Interim Governor of Tranquebar on 20 October 1716 with large ceremonies. In a letter dated 19 October, Brun-Lundegaard thanked the D.E.I.C. for the appointment but described himself as a weak and meek man and instead applied for a replacement. Again in 1718, he applied for a replacement, but had to wait another two years. Meanwhile, there was a severe shortage of money in the colony, and it had to borrow 6,000 pagodas from the English at Madras and another 5,000 Danish rigsdaler from a local magnate. In 1720, a Danish ship, the Jomfru Susanne, finally reached Tranquebar, along with the hofjunker (a young nobleman who serves in the court) and new opperhoved, Ulrik Christian Nissen. Subsequently, Brun-Lundegaard resigned on 2 January 1720 and instead became the vice governor and chief merchant (overkøbmand).

=== Reestablishment of Dannemarksnagore ===
In 1716, Tranquebar was visited by a Bengali envoy, named Chandusi, who offered to return Dannemarksnagore, which had been conquered by the Mughals in 1714, in return for the Bengali vessel, Fatteromany, which had previously been captured by the Danes. After long negotiations, the former lodge was ceded back to the D.E.I.C. in 1718, and in September the same year, a new governor, Gallus Bøgvad, was sent to the lodge to try to recreate the former conditions, but to no avail.

=== Relationship with missionaries ===
In contrast to Governor Hassius, Brun-Lundegaard has been considered by later literature to have been friendly to the Lutheran Danish-Halle Mission. Evidently, Brun-Lundegaard laid the foundation stone of the New Jerusalem Church in Tranquebar on 9 February 1717 and assisted in gathering resources and a suitable location for the building. (Note: Brun-Lundegaard and many other citizens contributed money towards the church constructions, and transportation of materials was permitted without any customs duties. As for the location, Brun-Lundegaard was careful not to offend the missionaries and sold them land for 100 Danish rigsdaler in the wealthy European city district.) In return, the missionaries arranged a sort of throne as a special place for the governor inside the church. Additionally, Brun-Lundegaard saluted from Fort Dansborg at the consecration of the building and donated a plaque to be built into the wall of the church with the inscription:

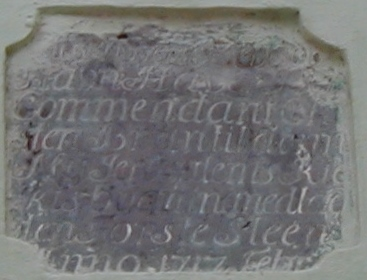
The plaque donated by Christen Brun-Lundegaard to the New Jerusalem Church in 1717

Psalm 122:6: Wish Jerusalem [Church] the best! May they prosper who love you! In the Name of the Lord Zebaoth, Governor Christian Brun laid the first foundation stone for the building known as the New Jerusalem Church. February 9, 1717.

However, according to Danish priest and historian Anders Nørgaard, there were no major differences between Governor Hassius and Brun-Lundegaard, and Brun-Lundegaard is even said to have been against the Mission. Moreover, there is no personal friendship between Brun-Lundegaard and the missionaries, although they met when it was necessary, and showed each other goodwill.

Instead, the change in relations between the local administration and the mission was caused by a new compromise reached in Denmark between the mission's inspectorate and the D.E.I.C. management. According to the new compromise, the colonial administration was to function as the mission's authority, rather than being a private cause of King Frederick IV. Meanwhile, the administration was thereby also obliged to subsidize the mission under its authority. Subsequently, the years following the compromise were a heyday for the mission, and there are no reports of problems between the mission and Governor Brun-Lundegaard.

== Personal and later life ==
Brun-Lundegaard was married twice: first to Wibeke Christensdatter Berg on 5 July 1714, and second to Utilia Elisabeth on 29 November 1723, after Wibeke Christensdatter's death in the same year. Utilia Elisabeth was the widow of the former leader of the Danish-Halle Mission, Johann Ernst Gründler.

Brun-Lundegaard died on 24 January 1724 in Tranquebar after a long illness, leaving no children.

== See also ==
- Eskild Andersen Kongsbakke – c. 1620 – 1674 Danish commander and Governor of Danish India
- Bartholomäus Ziegenbalg – German Lutheran clergy (1682–1719)
- Mikkel Knudsen Crone – Governor of Saint Thomas from 1709 to 1716

== Notes and references ==
=== Works cited ===
- Larsen, Kay (1940). Guvernører, Residenter, Kommandanter og Chefer [Governors, Residents, Commanders and Chiefs] (PDF) (in Danish). Copenhagen: Arthur Jensens Forlag.
- Larsen, Kay (1907). De dansk-ostindiske Koloniers Historie [History of the Danish East Indian Colonies] (in Danish). Copenhagen: Centralforlaget.
- Larsen, Kay (1908). De dansk-ostindiske koloniers historie – De Bengalske loger & Nikobarerne [History of the Danish East Indian Colonies – The Bengali lodges & the Nicobar Islands] (in Danish). Vol. 2. Copenhagen: Centralforlaget.
- Diller, Stephan (1999). Die Dänen in Indien, Südostasien und China (1620-1845) [The Danes in India, Southeast Asia and China (1620-1845)] (in German). Harrassowitz Verlag. p. 221. ISBN 978-3-447-04123-2.
- Grane, Leif [in Danish]; Lausten, Martin Schwarz [in Danish]; Stenbæk, Jørgen; et al. (Nørgaard, Anders) (1977). "Tranquebarmissionens tidlige historie" [The Tranquebar Mission's early History]. Kirkehistoriske Samlinger 1977 [Church historical collections] (PDF). Kirkehistoriske Samlinger (in Danish). Digitalized by Claus Rønlev. Copenhagen: Akademisk Forlag. ISBN 87-500-1784-5.
- Sweetman, Will [at Wikidata]; Ilakkuvan, R. (1 April 2012). Bibliotheca Malabarica. Institut Français de Pondichéry. ISBN 9791036544279.
- Jeyaraj, Daniel (2006). Bartholomäus Ziegenbalg, the Father of Modern Protestant Mission. Chennai: Indian Society for Promoting Christian Knowledge & Gurukul Lutheran Theological College. ISBN 81-7214-920-4.
- Hermansen, Karsten (2003). Kirken, kongen og enevælden [Church, King, and Absolutism] (PDF) (in Danish). University of Southern Denmark.
- Gregersen, Hans [in Danish] (2018). Trankebar [Tranquebar] (in Danish). Lindhardt & Ringhof. ISBN 9788711978337.
- Dahl, Aage (1933). Haderslevs bys præstehistorie [History of Haderslev town] (PDF). Den Sønderjydske Gejstligheds Historie og Genealogi (in Danish). Copenhagen: O. Lohse.
- Gross, Andreas; Kumaradoss, Yesurajamony; Liebau, Heike, eds. (2006). "The Churches of Tranquebar in the Danish Period 1620-1845". Halle and the Beginning of Protestant Christianity in India. Vol. 1–3. Halle, Germany: Francke Foundations. p. 238. ISBN 3-931479-84-6.
  - Nørgaard, Anders. "The Mission's Relationship to the Danes". In Gross, Kumaradoss & Liebau (2006).
  - Kryger, Karin. "The Churches of Tranquebar in the Danish Period 1620-1845". In Gross, Kumaradoss & Liebau (2006).
