= Nissen (noble family) =

- Nobility
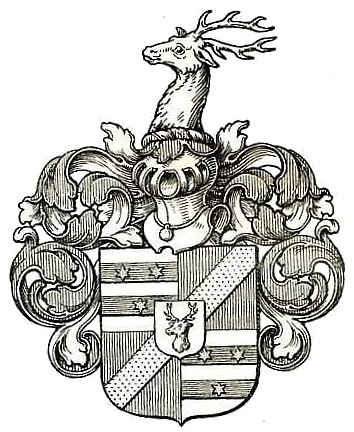
- Coat of arms of the von Nissen (von Nissen-Benzon) family, granted upon ennoblement in 1710, from Danmarks Adels Aarbog. The family arms in the centre.
- Country: Denmark; Norway; Germany
- Place of origin: Southern Jutland
- Founded: 3 November 1710 (ennoblement)
- Founder: Henrik Lorentzen

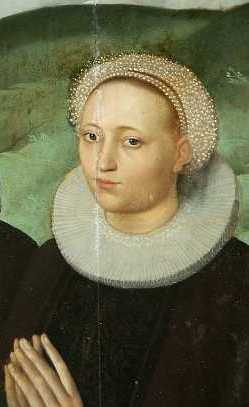
Anna Nissen (1595–1654), mother of Lorentz Nicolaus Nissen.

Nissen, von Nissen and von Nissen-Benzon is a Danish family of land owners from Southern Jutland, which was partially ennobled in 1710. It is descended from Henrik Lorentzen (Schack) (born ca. 1450), who in 1484 was granted the estate of Oldemorstoft (a so-called free estate, frigård, i.e. a privileged estate) as a fief by John, King of Denmark. Members of the family were land owners and from the 17th century war commissioners, judges, councillors of state (etatsråd), Governors (stiftamtmann), Supreme Court Justice and General in Denmark. Family members served as Governor of Tranquebar, plantation owner and Vice Governor of the Danish West Indies in the 18th century. In Denmark, the family owned the estates of Oldemorstoft, Lerbæk, Rugballegaard, Brantbjerg, the Stamhus of Skærsø and others between the 15th century and the 18th century. In the 17th century, King Christian IV of Denmark was a guest at Oldemorstoft several times. The name von Nissen was used by the noble branch and military officers of the family.

Herman Lorentz von Nissen was ennobled on 3 November 1710. He was married to Ida Sophie Amalie Glud (1672–1703), daughter of Bishop of Viborg Søren Glud and Ida Christine Moth, a sister of the King's mistress Sophie Amalie Moth. Ida Sophie Amalie Glud was hence a first cousin of King Christian V's son Ulrik Christian Gyldenløve, Count of Samsø. Herman Lorentz' and Ida Sophie Amalie's sons were Christian Ulrich von Nissen-Benzon of Skærsø (1691–1756), Governor of Tranquebar 1720–26 and commandant of Dansborg from 1718, councillor of state, Governor of Trondhjems Stiftamt, Aarhus Stiftamt, Copenhagen, and Supreme Court Justice 1744–56, and Major-General Christian Siegfried von Nissen-Benzon of Skærsø (1690–1763). They inherited the Stamhus of Skærsø from their cousin Sophie Amalia Benzon of Skærsø in 1754. Christian Siegfried von Nissen-Benzon was the father of Christine Sophie von Nissen-Benzon (1734–1772), married to colonel Jacob Ludvig de Vauvert (1727–1809), and their descendants inherited Skærsø. Their grandson Jacob Ludvig Fischer (1776–1833) was ennobled in 1805 and granted the name von Fischer‑Benzon.

The current male line Nissen family is descended Herman Lorentz' brother, Nicolai Nissen (1664–1717), owner of Lerbæk and Rugballegaard and war commissioner in Scania during the Great Northern War and in Jutland. He was married to Elisabeth Sophie Banner-Høeg (1669–1739), daughter of Gregers Ulfstand Banner-Høeg of Vang og Birgitte Kaas, who belonged to the Danish Uradel and was descended from families such as Bille, Reventlow, Gyldenstierne, Rosenkrantz, Brahe, Rantzau and Walkendorff. Members of the family settled in Norway in the 18th century. The family today survives in Denmark, Norway, Germany and other countries. The noble branch is extinct in the male line.

== Famous members ==
- Christian Ulrich von Nissen-Benzon, Governor of Tranquebar, Supreme Court Justice, etc.
- Helge Nissen, Danish opera singer and Director of the Opera School of the Royal Danish Theatre
- Ingjald Nissen, Norwegian Psychologist
- Harald Nissen, Norwegian heraldic scholar
- Sophia Nissen, Danish Author and Sociologist

== Literature ==
- Harald Nissen and Gunnar Brun Nissen, Slekten Nissen fra Bov sogn i Sønderjylland, Trondheim, 1978
- von Nissen og von Nissen-Benzon, Danmarks Adels Aarbog 1927 II, 73; 1929, 312; 1944, 112; 1953, 44
- Norsk slektskalender, bind 1, Oslo 1949, Norsk Slektshistorisk Forening
- Hans Cappelen: Norske slektsvåpen, Oslo 1969 (2. opplag 1976), p. 177
- Paus, Chr[istopher] B[lom]. "Gravtale over sorenskriver Hans Paus' hustru Andrea Jespara Nissen av sogneprest i Kviteseid Johannes Brochmann 1772." Norsk slektshistorisk tidsskrift 12 (1950): 273-276.
- Nissen, in Store norske leksikon
