= Arrest attempt of Jørgen Bjørn =

1688 skirmish in the Atlantic Ocean

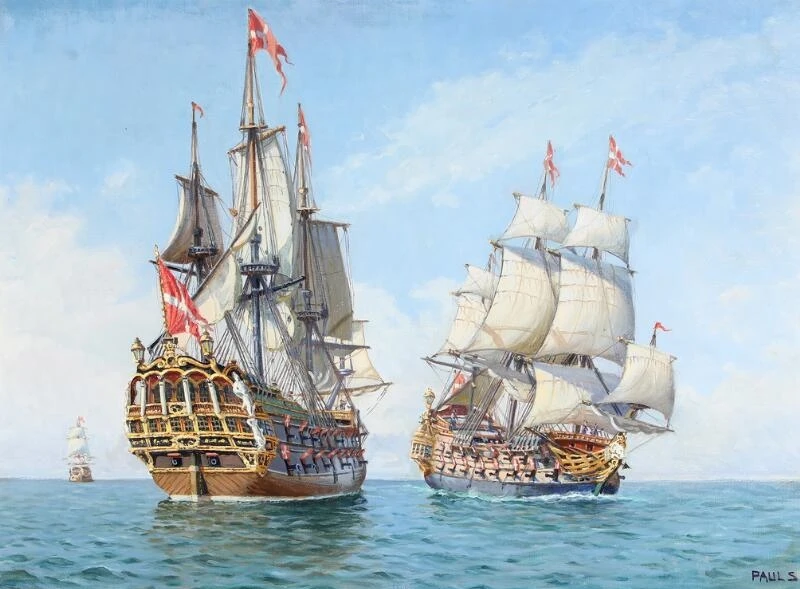
- Seascape with Danish frigates, by Paul Sinding
Date	29 February 1688
Location	Off Ascension Island 7°56′S 14°25′W
Result	Antoinetta victory

Belligerents
Danish India	(Danish India) Crew of Antoinetta

Commanders and leaders
(Danish India) Wolf von Kalnein (Danish India) Unk. ensign	(Danish India) Jørgen Bjørn

Units involved
(Danish India) Flyvende Ulv	(Danish India) Antoinetta

Strength
2 vessels	1 ship

Casualties and losses
None	None

The arrest attempt of Jørgen Bjørn took place on 29 February 1688 off Ascension Island, between the Governor of Danish India, Wolf Henrik von Kalnein, and his compatriot Captain Jørgen Bjørn.

On a return voyage from the Danish colony of Tranquebar, a conflict arose in the fleet between Governor Wolf Henrik von Kalnein and Captain Jørgen Bjørn. The conflict escalated upon the arrival of the Danish fleet off Ascension Island. Here, Governor von Kalnein summoned Bjørn to his ship; however, Bjørn refused, and von Kalnein subsequently sent two armed vessels to Bjørn's ship, the Antoinetta. After minor fire exchanges between them, the two smaller vessels were driven away.

Consequently, the Antoinetta detached itself from the fleet and returned to Copenhagen on its own.

== Background ==
On 19 September 1685, Wolf Henrik von Kalnein, an Oberstleutnant, got royal permission to investigate the conduct of Axel Juel, the governor of Danish India, following accusations of corruption and administrative abuses. Von Kalnein sailed off to India on 7 October of the same year, with his vessel Flyvende Ulv, together with Antoinette, captained by Jørgen Bjørn. The fleet reached the Danish colony of Tranquebar in 1686, and after resuming combat with the Bengalis, the fleet left again for Copenhagen in 1687.

== Arrest attempt ==
During the return voyage, Bjørn and von Kalnein became increasingly more in conflict: Some days after reaching the Cape of Good Hope on 7 January 1688, Bjørn wanted to go ashore with his shallop, but was held back by von Kalnein, who berated him in front of the entire crew.

After this, the fleet the Cape of Good Hope on 27 January and reached Ascension Island on 29 February. Here, the situation escalated when von Kalnein summoned Bjørn on board Flyvende Ulv. However, after his crew warned him and told Bjørn that von Kalnein wanted to arrest him, the former excused himself and stayed on board Antoinette. Subsequently, von Kalnein sent 2 vessels with armed men and an ensign to Antoinette. Upon their arrival, Bjørn requested the seamen to lay down their arms and come on board; however, the ensign jumped on the deck and put a gun to Bjørn's breast. Simultaneously, the crew of Antoinette took their arms and drove the ensign and his men away.

=== Aftermath ===
After the incident, the ship council on Antoinetta resolved to make the ship ready for sailing in all eventualities. In fear of retaliation, the council decided to detach Antoinetta from the fleet on 5 March 1688. Antoinetta reached Copenhagen on 19 June, but Bjørn initially refrained from complaining about the incident. Meanwhile, Flyvende Ulv and the rest of the fleet landed at Kinsale, Ireland, on 20 July, as Flyvende Ulv lost its wheel during a storm. Additionally, von Kalnein had fallen overboard and had his left arm dislocated. Followingly, a couple of Danish frigates came to Kinsale and escorted the seamen back to Denmark.

== See also ==
- Ambush at Portudal – 1619 ambush of Danes by natives
- Action of 19 February 1619 – Naval engagement between Danish ships and French privateers
