= Siege of Dansborg =

Siege of Dansborg or siege of Tranquebar may refer to:

- Siege of Dansborg (1624)
- Willem Leyel's siege of Dansborg (1644)
- Siege of Dansborg (1644)
- Sieges of Tranquebar (1655–1669)
- Siege of Tranquebar (1699)
- Capture of Tranquebar (1801)
- Surrender of Tranquebar (1808)

== See also ==
- Cattle War
- Tranquebar
- Dano-Mughal War
- Conquest of Koneswaram Temple
