= Attack in Hooghly =

1671 Danish attack on Bengali vessels in Hooghly

Attack in Hughli
- Part of Dano-Mughal War
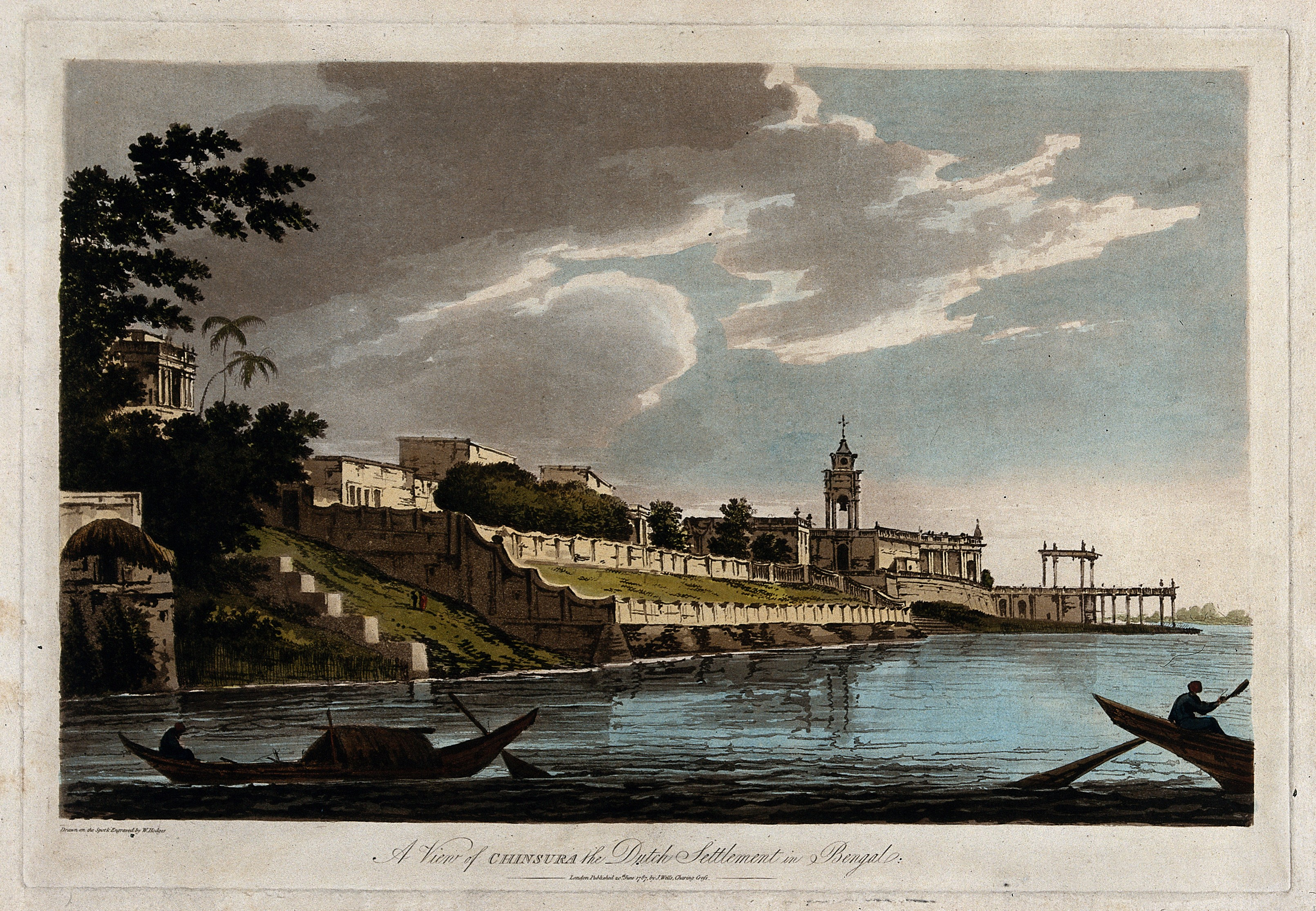
- A View of Chinsura, the Dutch settlement in Bengal
Date	1671
Location	Hugli-Chuchura, (modern-day West Bengal, India) 22.90°N 88.39°E
Result	Danish victory

Belligerents
Danish India	Bengal Subah

Commanders and leaders
(Danish India) Unknown	Unknown

Strength
Multiple ships	2 ships

Casualties and losses
Unknown	2 ships destroyed

The Attack in Hooghly (Danish; Angrebet i Hooghly) was a Danish attack on two Bengali ships during the Dano-Mughal War in 1671. The Danes succeeded in blowing up the Bengali ships, and violence continued off the coasts of Kalingapatnam and Balasore.

== Background ==
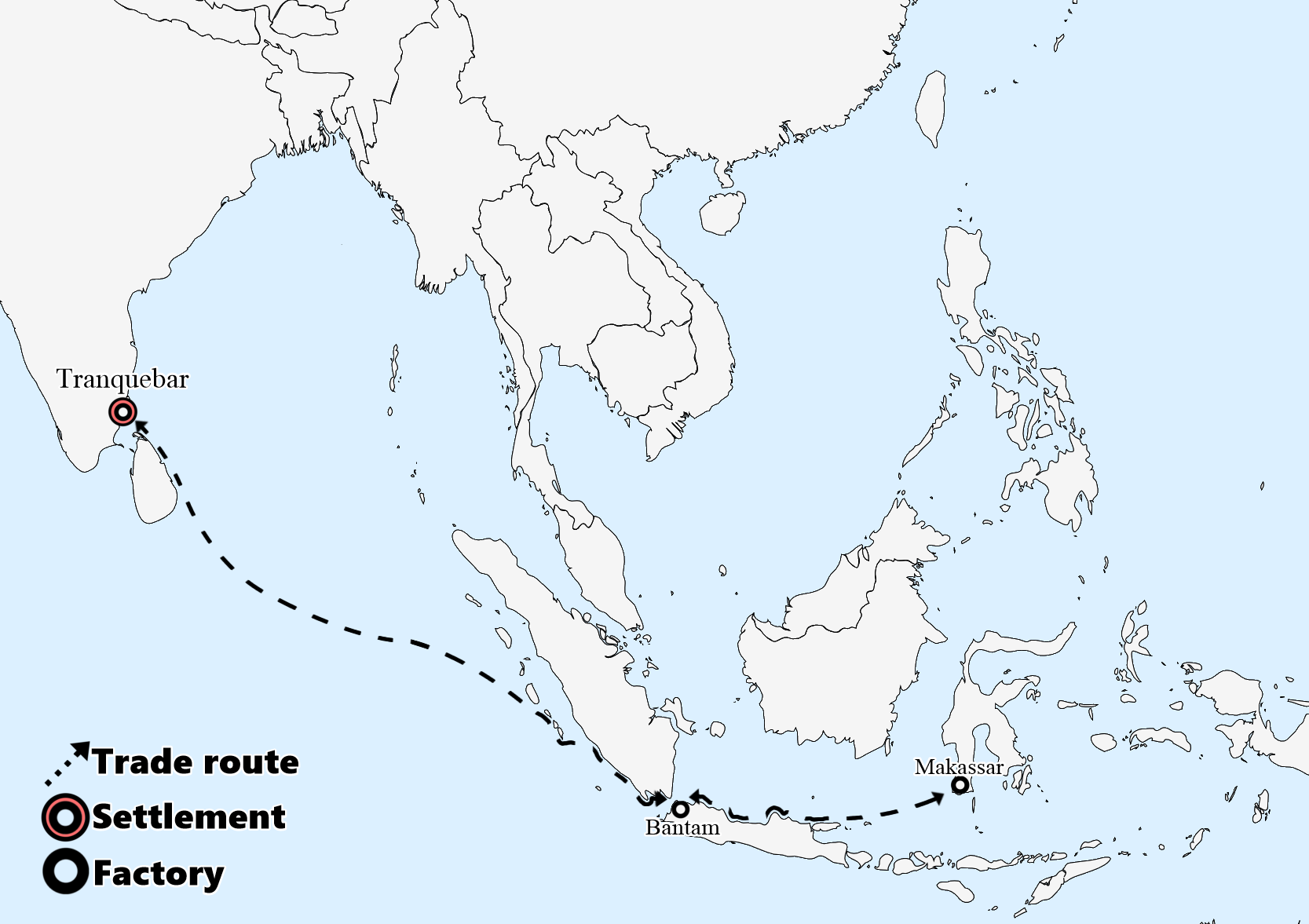
Danish trade routes and settlements in India during the isolation from Denmark, 1643-1669

In 1642 the Danish East India Company declared war on the Mughal Empire. Because of the Dano-Swedish Wars Denmark did not have the means to send any ships to Danish India, and relations were subsequently cut. Relations with Denmark were reestablished in 1669 together with a new Danish East India Company. At this point the war against Bengal was approved by the Danish government, yet urged the Danes in India to sue for peace if advantageous.

In 1672 king Christian V of Denmark (r 1670–1699) requested compensation for the losses of Danish vessels, though this request was never fulfilled by the Mughals. This, along with other factors, made the Danes increasingly brazen, and the Danes even attacked Bengal itself in 1671.

== Expedition to Bengal ==
In 1672 a Danish force were brought to Hooghly. The Danish East India Company sold most of their goods to two local Bengali merchants; Rangsordas and Sonderdas. They sold their goods to them as a compromise not to trade with others for the next couple of months. At Hooghly the Danes noticed two Bengali ships, which were returning from a voyage to Ceylon. The ships were driven towards land near Hooghly, and the Danes subsequently blew the Bengali vessels up.

== Aftermath ==
The renewed violence continued during the following years. In 1673 the Danes took a large Bengali ship of 170 cargoes near Balasore, and transported it to Tranquebar. This also happened to another ship which was carrying Maldivian cowries the same year.

== See also ==
- Dannemarksnagore
- Skirmish at Pipli – 1642 assualt of a Danish factory in Bengal
- Cattle War – Conflict between Danish India and the Thanjavur Maratha kingdom
- Loss of the St. Jacob – 1640 grounding of a Danish ship
- Dano-Mughal War – Danish colonial conflict against the Mughal Empire

== Works cited ==
- Andersen, Eskil (1669). Ostindiske sager (1668 - 1699). Copenhagen: Danske Kancelli.
- Bredsdorff, Asta (2009). The Trials and Travels of Willem Leyel. Copenhagen: Museum Tusculanum Press. ISBN 9788763530231.
- Coolhaas, Ed (2007). Generale missiven van gouverneurs-generaal en raden aan heren XVII (in Dutch). Vol. III. pp. 763–764.
- Wellen, Kathryn (2015). The Danish East India Company's War against the Mughal Empire, 1642-1698 (PDF). Royal Netherlands Institute for Southeast Asian and Caribbean Studies.
- Videnskab (2018). Serampore var en glemt dansk koloni – mens den var koloni (in Danish). Videnskab.dk.
