= Capture of Serampore (1808) =

1808 British capture of Serampore

- Part of the English Wars
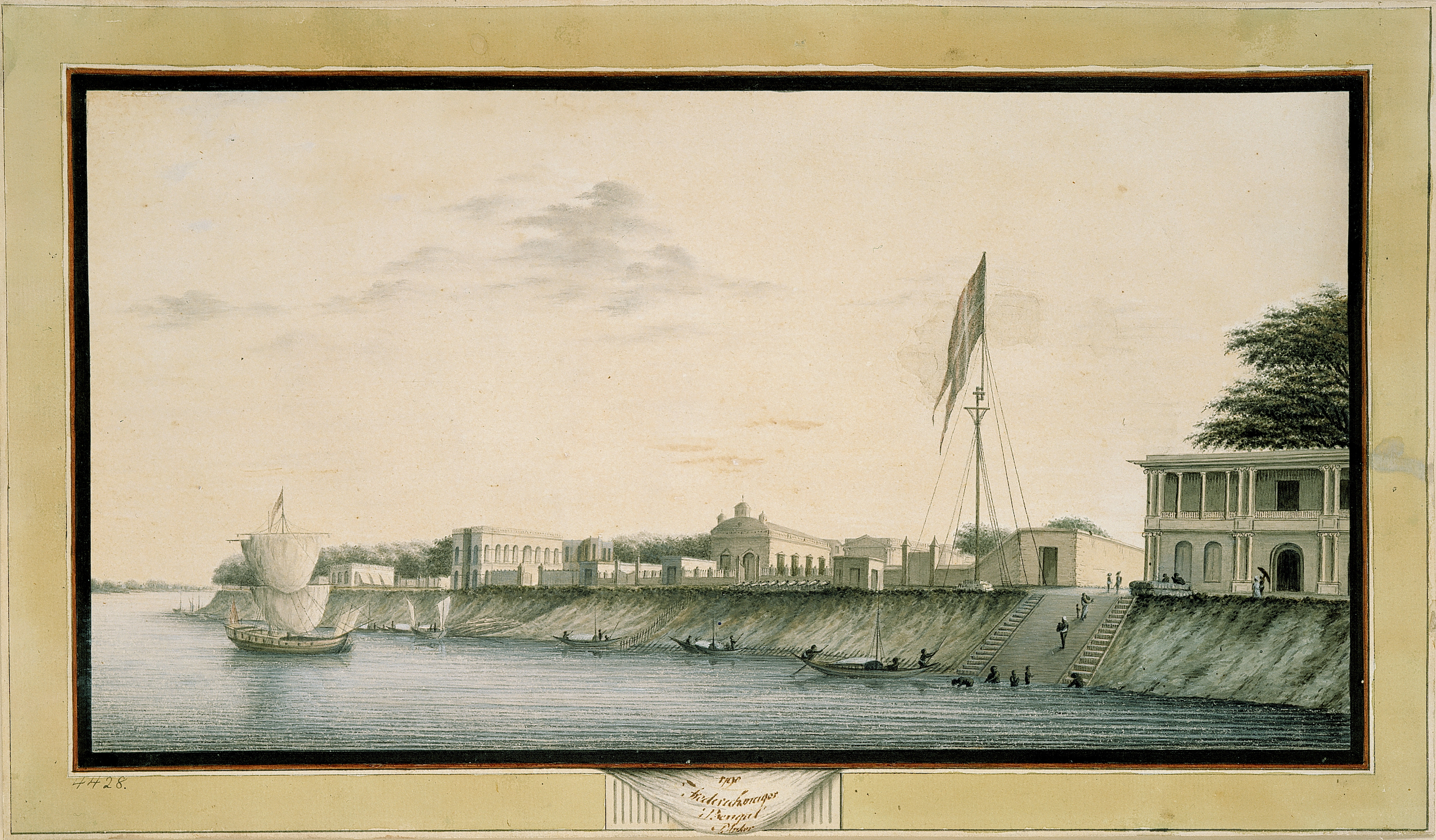
- Painting of Danish Serampore (Frederiksnagore), by Peter Anker
| Date | 28 January 1808 |
| Location | Serampore, Bengal 22.75°N 88.34°E |
| Result | British victory |
| Territorial changes | Serampore occupied by Britain |

Belligerents
| Denmark-Norway | Great Britain |

Commanders and leaders
| (Denmark–Norway) Jacob Kræfting | (United Kingdom) Carey (United Kingdom) George Elliot (United Kingdom) William Montagu (United Kingdom) Neviusore Courey |

Units involved
| (Denmark–Norway) HDMS Waldemarr (Denmark–Norway) HDMS Elizabeth (Denmark–Norway) HDMS Freya (Denmark–Norway) HDMS Holstein (Denmark–Norway) HDMS Maria (Denmark–Norway) HDMS Mary (Denmark–Norway) HDMS Nymphe | (United Kingdom) HMS Modeste (United Kingdom) HMS Terpsichore (United Kingdom) HMS Dasher (United Kingdom) 3 Sepoy companies |

Strength
| 12 ships c. 40 men Few cannons | 3 ships Unknown amount of men |

Casualties and losses
| 12 ships | Unknown |

The Capture of Serampore (Danish: Overtagelsen af Frederiksnagore), also commonly known as the Second Capture of Serampure (Den anden overtagelse af Frederiksnagore), was a siege and capture of the Danish colony of Serampore by British forces on 28 January 1808. The Danes capitulated immediately after the arrival of the British, as the latter's forces were far superior.

== Background ==
In 1801, the conflict between Denmark–Norway and Great Britain extended to their colonial territories, including India. On 8 May 1801, Serampore, a settlement of Danish India, capitulated to British forces led by Colonel Dickson. Similar occurrences took place in Tranquebar and the Danish West Indies. However, the hostilities came to an end following the Treaty of Amiens in 1802, which stipulated that Britain would withdraw from Danish possessions.

== Capture ==
A second rupture between Britain and Denmark–Norway occurred in September 1807, and Lieutenant Colonel Carey was sent to capture Serampore. On the morning of 28 January 1808, Carey led three Sepoy companies from Fort William over the Hooghly River and surrounded Serampore.

According to Carl Bering Liisberg in his Danmarks søfart og søhandel, a British detachment marched into Serampore, disarmed the guards, and occupied the lodge without any time for a Danish surrender. However, according to other sources, Colonel Carey demanded the surrender of the town and factory, which the Danish governor, Jacob Kræfting, steadily accepted. Additionally, all twelve Danish vessels harbouring in the Hooghly River were seized by the companies.

== Aftermath ==
Britain would occupy Serampore until 1815, however, Kræfting would preserve his position as Governor, while being paid by the British commissioner.

Despite British demise, the Baptist Serampore Mission Press would lose its Danish protection but was allowed to operate without interruption.

== Works cited ==
- Larsen, Kay (1940). Guvernører, Residenter, Kommandanter og Chefer (PDF) (in Danish). Copenhagen: ARTHUR JENSENS FORLAG.
- Liisberg, H. C. Bering (2020-01-13). Danmarks søfart og søhandel. Bind 1 (in Danish). Lindhardt og Ringhof. ISBN 978-87-26-30660-6.
- Marshman, John Clark (1864). The Story of Carey. J. Heaton.
- Sandeman, Hugh David (1868). Selections from Calcutta Gazettes of the Years 1806 to 1815 Inclusive. Vol. IV. Office of Superintendent Government Printing.
- Marshman, John Clark (2023-04-17). The Life and Times of Carey, Marshman, and Ward: Vol. I. BoD – Books on Demand. ISBN 978-3-382-31348-7.
- Glover, Gareth (2018-09-30). "10". The Two Battles of Copenhagen, 1801 and 1807: Britain and Denmark in the Napoleonic Wars. Casemate Publishers. ISBN 978-1-4738-9833-2.
