= P. Thankappan Nair =

Indian historian (1933–2024)

- Born: Parameswaren Thankappan Nair; 30 April 1933; Kalady, Kingdom of Cochin, India
- Died: 18 June 2024 (aged 91)
- Education: University of Calcutta
- Occupations: Author, historian, researcher
- Spouse: Sita Devi

Parameswaran Thankappan Nair (30 April 1933 – 18 June 2024) was an Indian writer, independent researcher, historian and Malayali author based in Kolkata, who wrote extensively on the history of Calcutta in the English language. Fondly referred to as the "Barefoot Historian", he published 61 books, with the latest titled "Gandhiji in Kolkata".

== Personal life ==
P. T. Nair was born at Manjapra near Kalady, in the Changanattuveettil family. As of 2023, he relocated to Chendamangalam, a small town in Ernakulam district of Kerala, following his family's concerns about him.

Nair died on 18 June 2024, at the age of 91.

== Career and research ==
After passing his matriculation from Alwaye, Kerala, he arrived in Kolkata (the then Calcutta) in September 1955 in the Madras Mail. He earned a B.A and LL.B at the University of Calcutta, and had started out as a typist at a salary of Rs 125. As the subject of the city was largely unexplored, he chose to write on the city, and spent the next five decades researching and writing on it as a hobby.

As an outsider, his work dealt extensively with perspectives overlooked by institutional, and nationalist historians in India. In so doing he extensively examined British social life in Calcutta, the history of Calcutta High Court, the city's taverns and hotels, and the city's south Indian diaspora.

Nair was the owner of large collection of rare books. It was told that the Oxford Library at the University of Oxford sent him a blank cheque for buying those books on behalf of the library. But he chose to donate it to the Calcutta Town Hall Society.

He was honoured by Burdwan University with a D.Litt. degree.

In 1991 he announced the 300th anniversary of Calcutta city through his research.

Often known as the barefoot historian of Calcutta, or popularly known as Nair Babu, he used his 1964 Remington typewriter and lived at 82/C, Kansaripara Road, Bhowanipore, Kolkata-700025

prior to return to Kerala.[3][17]

== Awards ==
- Honorary D.Litt. from the University of Burdwan
- Senior research professor at the Asiatic Society.

== Selected books ==
- First Circulating and College Libraries of Calcutta (2012)
- Origin of National Library in India (2004)
- Kalakātā āche kalakātātei (in Bengali) (2009)
- Origin of the Kolkata Police (2007)
- B.S. Kesavan: First National Librarian of India (2005)
- South Indians in Kolkata: History of Kannadigas, Konkanis, Malayalees, Tamilians, Telugus, South Indian Dishes and Tippoo Sultan's Heirs in Calcutta (2004)
- John Alexander Chapman: Selections from the Works of a Lover of India (2004)
- Echoes from Belvedere: Home of National Library, Kolkata (2004)
- Hicky and his Gazette (2001)
- The Mango in Indian Life and Culture (1995)
- Calcutta Tercentenary Bibliography Volumes 1 & 2 (1993)
- British Beginnings in Bengal, 1600-1660 (1991)
- James Prinsep: Life and Work - Volume 1 (1991)
- Job Charnock: The Founder of Calcutta: an Anthology (1990)
- Calcutta Bevy: A Collection of Rare Poems (1989)
- Calcutta Municipal Corporation at a Glance (1989)
- Indian National Songs and Symbols (1987)
- A History of Calcutta's Streets (1987)
- A History of the Calcutta Press, the Beginnings (1987)
- Rainey's a Historical and Topographical Sketch of Calcutta (edited work of H. James Rainey) (1986)
- Calcutta in the Seventeenth Century (1986)
- Calcutta: Origin of the Name (1985)
- Bruton's Visit to Lord Jagannatha 350 years ago (edited work of William Bruton) (1985)
- Tribes of Arunachal Pradesh (1985)
- Calcutta in the 18th Century (1984)
- British Social Life in Ancient Calcutta: 1750 to 1850 (1983)
- Marriage and Dowry in India (1978)
- The Peacock: The National Bird of India (1977)
