= Topass =

Indo-Portuguese sailors and soldiers

Topass (Topass, Topass Seaman or Topas) was a term used by the British Empire for sailors and soldiers of Indo-Portuguese descent who served as foot soldiers in the army and as the equivalent of boy first class in the Royal Navy. They were often assigned the most unpopular duties aboard the ship, such as cleaning latrines. The Topasses possibly originated from soldiers raised in the 18th century in Madras as a private force to protect local factories. They were employed as mercenaries and used to bolster the ranks of the East India Company in India, especially during times when Britain was at war and the company struggled to recruit soldiers.

== Navy ==
Topass could be a word representing the sepoy-style sailors of the "Great Mogul" emperor's fleet of Polacca ships, more likely harboured at places like Calicut and Pulicat, a fleet that controlled Cape Comorin.

== See also ==
- Sepoy
- Polacca
