= Johan Sigismund Hassius =

Governor of Tranquebar from 1704 to 1716

18th Governor of Tranquebar
- In office 1 July 1704 – 20 October 1716
- Monarch: Frederick IV
- Preceded by: Jørgen Bjørn
- Succeeded by: Christen Brun-Lundegaard

7th Governor of the Diocese of Christianssand
- In office 1718–1728
- Monarch: Frederick IV
- Preceded by: Henrik Adeler
- Succeeded by: Alexander Frederik Møsting

9th Governor of Nedenes County
- In office 1719–1728
- Monarch: Frederick IV
- Preceded by: Henrik Adeler
- Succeeded by: Alexander Frederik Møsting

Personal details
- Born: c. 1664 Christianssand, Denmark–Norway
- Died: 4 October 1728 Christianssand, Denmark–Norway
- Resting place: Kristiansand Cathedral, Norway
- Spouse: Anna Lauritsdatter Uddal (m. 1707)
- Children: 3
- Parent(s): Heinrich Sigismund Hassius; Anna Cathrine Jürgers

Military service
- Allegiance: Denmark–Norway
- Branch/service: Norwegian Armed Forces
- Years of service: 1688–1691
- Rank: Regimental quartermaster

Johan Sigismund Hassius von Lillienpalm to Svanøe (Note: Danish pronunciation: [johan sigismɔn hasius fɔn liljənpalm]) (c. 1664 – 4 October 1728) was a Dano-Norwegian nobleman and governor of Danish India from 1 July 1704 to 20 October 1716.

Johan Hassius was born in Norway in about 1664 and entered the Norwegian Army in 1687, being regimental quartermaster from 1688 to 1691. In 1703, he went to Danish India on an appointment by the Danish East India Company. A year later, he became governor of the Danish colony of Tranquebar after the death of the previous governor, Jørgen Bjørn. As governor, he misused his position for his own interests, practising corruption and private trade, while abusing his authority towards his opponents. He subsequently became a big opponent of the newly established Danish-Halle Mission, which took orders from the King of Denmark, instead of him.

He was dismissed as governor on 16 August 1716 and returned to Copenhagen in 1717. Despite his conduct in India, he was ennobled on 17 January 1718 and afterward became the governor of the Diocese of Christianssand and Nedenes County.

Hassius died on 4 October 1728 and was buried in Christianssand Cathedral's burial chamber.

== Early career ==
Johan Sigismund Hassius was born in Norway (Note: Either in Christiania or Kongsberg.) in about 1664 to Heinrich Hassius and Anna Cathrine Jürgers. In 1687, Johan Hassius became an auditeur (legal official in the army) and was the regimental quartermaster of the 1st regular infantry regiment in Norway between 1688 and 1691. However, in 1691, he was arrested for unpaid debt, but avoided punishment thanks to his influential friends.

== Governor of Tranquebar ==
Due to his advocates and his will to further his career, the management of the Danish East India Company appointed him as assistenzeraad (assistant councillor) and sekonde (second-in-command) of the Danish colony of Tranquebar in 1703. Subsequently, Hassius departed from Copenhagen on the ship Fridericus Quartus and reached Tranquebar in June 1704. Upon reaching Tranquebar, Hassius discovered that the governor, Jørgen Bjørn, had died on 12 June, and Hassius consequently assumed the governorship of the colony on 1 July with great splendor.

=== Administration and trade ===
On 26 September 1707, Hassius's status as governor was approved by royal decree. Hassius did not sacrifice much for the company, but instead used the system to his own personal and economic advantage. Both he and the members of the privy council (secrete råd) were highly corrupt. Hassius used his fortune on private business deals and especially private trade, which was forbidden by the company. Notwithstanding, because of his heat intolerance, he had already requested his return to Denmark–Norway on 26 October 1708, yet the privy council convinced him to stay. Again in 1709 and 1714, Hassius requested his dismissal. (Note: Hassius's contract had expired by 1714, and he had recently been subjected to an assault by several soldiers. However, the privy council had persuaded him to stay again.)

Despite the corruption and private trade, the regional trade initially increased, with three to four ships arriving from Copenhagen every year. Simultaneously, vessels like Dansborg and yachts like Gyldenløve, Prins Wilhelm, and Elefanten were regularly trading at ports in the Bay of Bengal. As such, from 1699 to 1709, the D.E.I.C. had a surplus of 189,665 Danish rigsdaler.

However, in the subsequent years, regional commerce decreased under Hassius's leadership. Meanwhile, the Great Northern War and a new plague outbreak halted the regular shipping from Copenhagen, and the few cargoes that reached Denmark from India had poor marketing. Moreover, several accidents occurred, and in the span of a few years, the company lost many of its best ships. In 1711, the colony's finances were in a meager state, while salaries were irregularly paid and officials were forced to use bribery and gifts. Additionally, there was no supervision of the officials, and Hassius took advantage of this with recklessness. As a result, Hassius became extremely wealthy from his tenure as governor. The D.E.I.C. quickly became dissatisfied with Hassius's arbitrariness and violent behavior and subsequently sent a commissioner to investigate the conditions in the colony. The commissioner, Hendrik Bonsack, reached Tranquebar on 7 October 1710, but accomplished little.

=== Evacuation of Dannemarksnagore ===
The decrease in shipping also affected the Danish lodge, Dannemarksnagore, in Bengal, which had not received supplies from Tranquebar for a couple of years. Consequently, the governor of Dannemarksnagore, Rasmus Hansen Attrup, deemed it necessary to obtain loans from a local Mughal magnate, but when these loans could not be repaid, the Bengali government took the opportunity to intervene. Subsequently, Dannemarksnagore was besieged in 1714, while Attrup and the Danes fled by ship to Tranquebar, saving goods worth 33,293 Danish rigsdaler. After Attrup abandoned Dannemarksnagore, Hassius became openly hostile to him, describing him as warmongering and non-understandable. Hassius accused Attrup of already distributing some of the money saved from Bengal, and responded by declaring that the rest of the sum was going to fund a new sail and rigging for a ship. However, in reality, the remaining sum was likely used for Hassius's personal interests.

From the Summer of 1715 to the following Winter, Tranquebar involved itself in a war between the Kingdom of Thanjavur and the Maravar Kingdom, leasing the former two armed vessels. As part of this agreement, the two nearby villages of Tevanur and Cattuchery were acquired by Tranquebar for a yearly payment of 100 rupees. Nonetheless, disputes over the terms of the lease and allegations of bribery resulted in prolonged internal conflicts within Tranquebar and temporarily strained relations with Thanjavur.

Eventually, Hassius became involved in numerous legal proceedings and cases. Accordingly, on 16 August 1716, Hassius was dismissed as governor after the ship, Salvator Mundi, reached Tranquebar on 17 March following an unusually prolonged interruption in communication with Denmark–Norway. This was received with sorrow throughout the colony and nearby cities, although many others were relieved. Subsequently, he departed from Tranquebar on 22 October 1716 with his wife, children, and a large fortune, reaching Copenhagen in 1717. Additionally, he was found guilty of abuse of power on 16 December and had transferred the governorate to Christen Brun Lundegaard on 20 October. Despite the British East India Company offering him a more convenient ship, Hassius decided to undertake the return voyage with the Salvator Mundi.

== Relationship with missionaries ==
When the first Lutheran missionaries from the Danish-Halle Mission reached Tranquebar on 9 July 1706, Hassius immediately relegated them to the lowest status. The missionaries were sent by King Frederick IV, without confronting the D.E.I.C. and Tranquebar's administration. As such, the city was surprised upon their arrival, and responded to the missionaries with carelessness and reluctance, while the majority of the Danish officials saw them as useless, unwanted guests.Additionally, the Catholics in the city became an obstacle, and Hassius thought that the mission would disrupt the good relationship with the Catholic population. Meanwhile, the local Hindus and Muslims found little interest: nevertheless, the first five Tamils were baptised on 12 May 1707, and a Lutheran church was erected in August the same year.

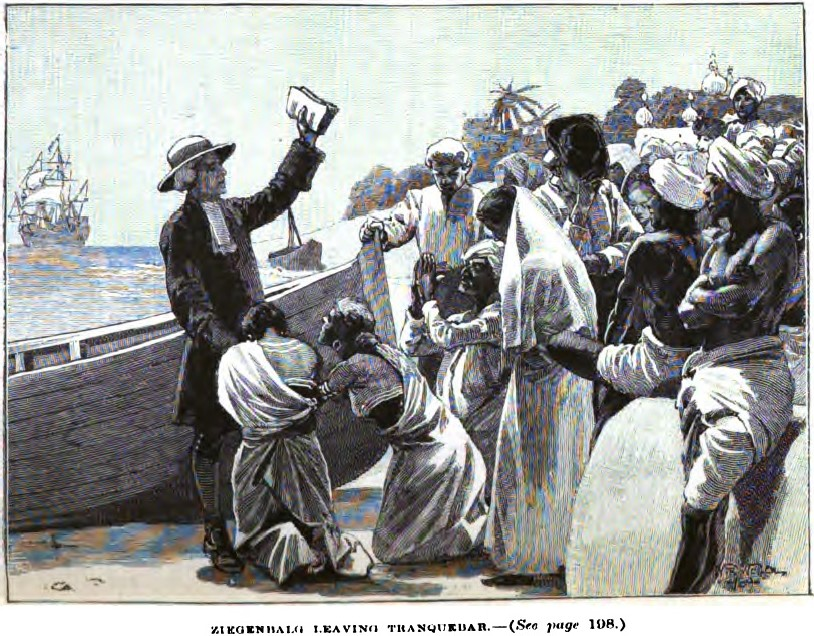
Illustration of Bartholomäus Ziegenbalg leaving Tranquebar, by the London Missionary Society in 1890

When the congregation reached about 100 members, the mission got involved in a conflict with Governor Hassius. Arguments were long and culminated in the imprisonment of the mission's leader, Bartholomäus Ziegenbalg, after he took care of a woman whom Hassius had banished from the colony. Despite this action exceeding Hassius's authority, he deemed it necessary as the fear of a revolt from the local population against the missionaries increased.

Ziegenbalg was released in January 1709, but the relationship between the missionaries and the administration was still tense: in 1711, Hassius tried to prevent Heinrich Plütschau from returning to Denmark–Norway to get backing from King Frederick IV. Nonetheless, Plütschau reached Denmark–Norway and managed to get support from King Frederick and the mission's inspectorate. Though the inspectorate could only recommend that Hassius and the missionaries conclude a truce.

Meanwhile, Hassius's own letter of protest to the D.E.I.C. management was answered differently:

We find that all the alarms that have occurred with the missionaries have had their origin in the commander's [Hassius's] excessive self-will and self-assumed authority.

— Management of the Danish East India Company

According to the management, Hassius had been too open about the missionaries, allowing them to hold sermons in German and build a church without asking the company. However, the worst was Hassius's decision to imprison Zeigenbalg, which, upon finding out, caused great concern to King Frederick IV, who saw it as inhumane. Consequently, the company management ordered Hassius not to offend the missionaries, but also ordered him to surveil their conduct.

In 1714, further supplies for the mission reached Tranquebar, along with a new letter from the company to Hassius. Hassius and the local administration were ordered by King Frederick IV to subsidize the missionaries with 1,000 Danish rigsdaler, but in this letter, the company recommended that Hassius should not pay this sum unless the missionaries mentioned it. Still, Hassius harassed the missionaries, and the conditions soon became so bad that Zeigenbalg decided to depart for Copenhagen for help. Hassius eventually allowed his departure, and Zeigenbalg left Tranquebar on 26 October 1714, reaching Denmark–Norway the following year. Zeigenbalg managed to gather considerable sums of money from Denmark, Norway, and Germany and returned to Tranquebar in February 1716.

According to the Danish priest and historian, Anders Nørgaard, the disputes between Hassius and Zeigenbalg were not personal, but were instead grounded on the wish of the mission that the administration would help their work. For the mission, Hassius was not their opponent, but rather the D.E.I.C. itself. Hence, the mission wanted Hassius to be a helper of the mission, despite this going against the role the company had ordered him to take. Furthermore, Nørgaard claims that the usual perception of Hassius as an enemy of the mission is misleading, and Hassius seemed to be on friendly terms with both Zeigenbalg and Johann Ernst Gründler.

== Later life ==
Upon returning from India, numerous lawsuits and claims for damages were initiated against him, and on 16 December 1718, Hassius's funds in Tranquebar were seized, including money he had in the company treasury. From this, deductions were to be made from the sums he had paid to the local Thanjavurian government. A couple of years later, on 26 October 1724, the company ruled that the case would be referred to the Danish Supreme Court.

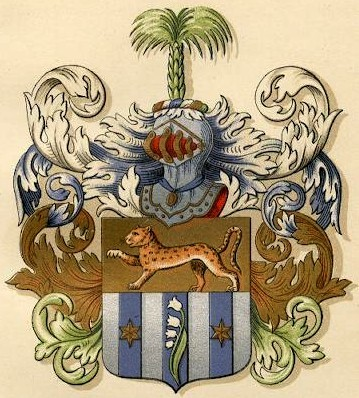
Hassius's coat of arms, which he received following his ennoblement.

Nevertheless, he got away with many of the other lawsuits, despite accusations and evidence of assault, as he covered war expenses during the Great Northern War from his large fortune. Furthermore, he became a councillor of justice (justitsråd) on 17 January 1718. On the same day, Hassius was ennobled under the name von Lillienpalm to Svanøe (Note: This toponymic surname is likely referring to Svaneø in Bergen Stift, where Hassius bought an estate.) and became diocese governor (stiftamtmand) of Christianssand in the same year. Hassius furthermore became county governor of Nedenes County in 1719 and bought Evje Church in 1724. Hassius governed these until his death on 4 October 1728. (Note: Older sources say 1729.) He was buried in Christianssand Cathedral's burial chamber.

== Personal life ==
Hassius married Anna Lauritsdatter Uddal in c. 1707, who was the widow of the former governor, Jørgen Bjørn. Subsequently, he received much of her fortune, (Note: Hassius estimated his fortune to be 30,000 Danish rigsdaler in 1718, but it was most likely considerably larger.) which she had inherited from Bjørn. Together, they had three children, including Henrik Sigismund Lillienpalm (born c. 1708), who became a major general. Furthermore, Hassius had a daughter named Anna Cathrina Johansdatter, who might have been an illegitimate child.

Hassius brought a whole court of native Tamil servants and slaves from his return voyage from Tranquebar to Christianssand. The number of slaves he owned was far greater than that of other Norwegian officials and nobles in the 18th century.

== See also ==
- Sivert Adeler – Danish captain and colonial administrator (1647–1683)
- Bernt Pessart – 17th-century Danish governor and president of Danish India from 1636–1643
- Axel Juel – Danish captain and colonial administrator (1655–1720)

== Works cited ==
- Larsen, Kay (1940). Guvernører, Residenter, Kommandanter og Chefer (PDF) (in Danish). Copenhagen: Arthur Jensens Forlag.
- Larsen, Kay (1907). De dansk-ostindiske Koloniers Historie [History of the Danish East Indian Colonies] (in Danish). Copenhagen: Centralforlaget.
- Bastrup, C. (1919). Danmarks Søfart og Søhandel [Danish Shipping and Maritime Trade] (PDF) (in Danish). Copenhagen: Nyt Nordisk Forlag.
- Bricka, Carl Frederik (1887). Dansk biografisk lexikon [Danish biographical dictionary] (in Danish). Copenhagen: Gyldendal. p. 290.
- Thomle, Erik Andreas (1888). Personhistorisk tidsskrift [Journal of personal history] (PDF) (in Danish). Vol. 3. Copenhagen: Samfundet for dansk genealogi og personalhistorie.
- Thomle, Erik Andreas (1906). Personhistorisk tidsskrift [Journal of personal history] (in Danish). Vol. 27. Harvard University: Samfundet for dansk genealogi og personalhistorie.
- Castenskiold, Christian (1872). Supplement ved Chr. C. L. v. Castenskiold (in Danish). Copenhagen: Kongelige Danske Genealogiske og Heraldiske Selskab. p. 331.
- Thiset, Anders; Hiort-Lorenzen, Hans (1902). Danmarks adels aarbog [Yearbook of the Danish nobility] (in Danish). Harvard University.
- Thomas, Paul; Von Hof, Jocelyne (2024). Norway's involvement in the transatlantic slave trade. Taylor & Francis.
- Hagen, Anton (2023). Guds rike i Trankebar [God's realm in Tranquebar] (in Swedish). Lund: Lund University.
- Christensen, Bernhard (2021). Om min grønlandske familie [About my Greenlandic family] (PDF) (in Danish). self-published.
- Nørgaard, Anders (1977). "Tranquebarmissionens tidlige historie" [The Tranquebar Mission's early History]. Kirkehistoriske Samlinger [Church historical collections] (PDF) (in Danish). Copenhagen: Selskabet for Danmarks Kirkehistorie. ISBN 87-500-1784-5.
- Hanfstängl, Michael (2006). Ein Missionar im Gefängnis? [A missionary in prison?] (in German). Mitteilungsblatt des Leipziger Missionswerkes.
- Weidling, Tor (2000). Eneveldets menn i Norge [Men of the absolutism in Norway] (PDF). Rigsarkivaren skriftserie (in Norwegian). Vol. 7. Oslo: Messel Forlag. p. 233. ISBN 82-548-0065-0.
- Ortiz, Samantha (2020). Educating the Protestant International. Department of History.
- Kloth-Jørgensen, Benny (2009). Krudt, kugler & kampmod [Gunpowder, bullets & fighting spirit] (in Danish) (1st ed.). Læsehesten. ISBN 978-1-4452-2232-5.
- Mallampalli, Chandra (2023). South Asia's Christians. Oxford University Press. p. 107. ISBN 9780190608910.
- Smith, Stefan Halikowski (2019). Two Missionary Accounts of Southeast Asia in the Late Seventeenth Century. Arc Humanities Press. ISBN 978-1641893183.
