= Gondalpara =

- Neighbourhood
- Location in West Bengal, India Gondalpara (India)
- Coordinates: 22.8437634°N 88.3657193°E
- Country: India
- State: West Bengal
- Division: Burdwan
- District: Hooghly

Government
  - Type: Municipal Corporation
  - Body: Chandernagore Municipal Corporation

Languages
  - Official: Bengali, English
- Time zone: UTC+5:30 (IST)
- Telephone code: +91 33
- Vehicle registration: WB
- Website: wb.gov.in

Gondalpara, previously known as Danmarksnagore, is a neighbourhood in Chandernagore of Hooghly district in the Indian state of West Bengal. It is a part of the area covered by Kolkata Metropolitan Development Authority (KMDA).

== History ==
The town was a Danish possession, also known as Danmarksnagore in 1698–1714 as part of Danish India, governed from Tranquebar. Dannemarksnagore was besieged in 1707, raided in 1713, and besieged again in 1714, leading to an evacuation of the place altogether.

After the Danish left in 1714, the French East India Company, amalgamated the settlements of Gondalpara, Khalisani and Boro to form Chandannagar. It remained a French colony till 1954, apart from certain periods in 1757 and during the Napoleonic Wars when Chandannagar was occupied by the British.

== Geography ==
Gondalpara is located at 22°50′38″N 88°21′57″E

It is a small place located in southeast Chandannagar. It consists of about 15 sub-localities. Some of them are Monsatala, Kachhari Ghat, Satghata, Charmondirtala, Natun Tilighat, Kolo Pukur Dhar, Kadamtala, Moran Road, and Binodtala. It is bounded by Besohata and Tematha to the west, Hooghly River to the east and north and Telinipara in the south. It is a half-moon shaped area bounded by water on two sides.
