= Kay Larsen =

Danish author and historian (1879–1947)

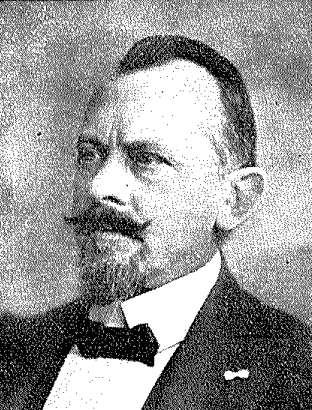
- Larsen in 1938
- Born: December 19, 1879; Church of the Holy Spirit, Copenhagen, Denmark
- Died: October 26, 1947 (aged 67); Ordrup, Denmark
- Occupation: Author
- Spouse: Helen Maud Meyer (m. 1917)
- Awards: Knight of the Dannebrog; Medal of Merit (silver)

Signature
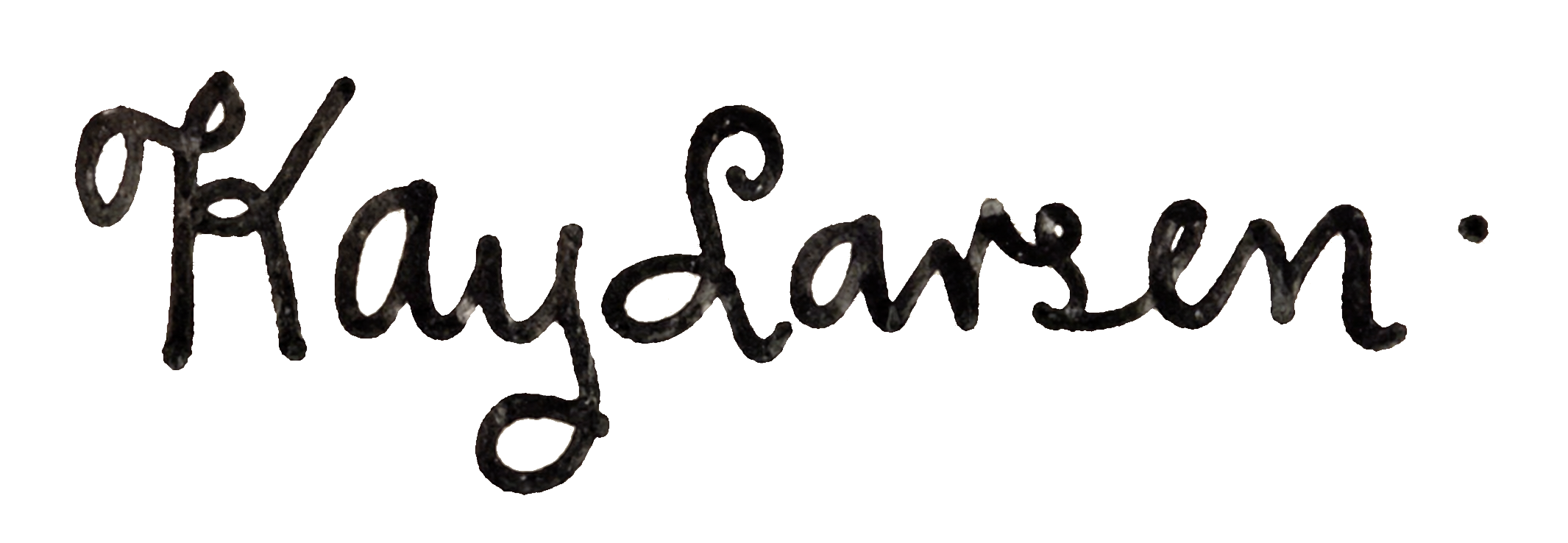

Kay Larsen R. F.M.2 (19 December 1879 – 26 October 1947) was a Danish author and colonial historian. He caused Danish colonial history to be an established academic discipline later than it was in many other countries.

== Early life ==
Kay Larsen was born in Copenhagen to Peter Heinrich Larsen and Ingrid Louise Vilhelmine Petersen. Upon turning 20, Larsen went to study internationally in trade and industry. After returning home, Larsen received domicile to operate wholesaling (grossererborgerskab) in Copenhagen in 1912. Subsequently, he operated a notable business in the Free Port of Copenhagen.

== Career ==
=== Member of Danish Authors' Society ===
Larsen had long been engaged in literature, and he was consequently a member of the Danish Authors' Society, becoming a member of its board of directors in 1915 and being the organization's secretary from 1916 to 1919. Larsen wanted to transform the organization into something more than a professional society. As a result, he played a big role in the organization's merger with National Forfatterforening in 1919, uniting all Danish authors under one society. The merger would prove to be of great financial importance. Additionally, Larsen was heavily involved in the establishment of the first Nordic author convention in Copenhagen, and the first Hamlet performances on Kronborg.

=== Authorship ===
While wholesaling, Larsen would use much of his free time on literary and historical works, initially publishing fiction books. Followingly, Larsen would publish some historical works on his local area, including Gentofte's history, becomming the Municipality's biggest contributor to local history. Nevertheless, most of his authorship was dedicated to the history of the Danish overseas colonies, already publishing two volumes of De dansk-ostindiske Koloniers Historie in 1907 and 1908. From here followed several other works, including De danske i Guinea in 1918, Dansk Vestindien, 1666-1917 in 1928, and Den danske Kinafart in 1932.

Apart from colonial history, Larsen's biggest historical contribution was to naval and merchant shipping, cooperating with the Minister for the Navy and acting as their consultant in investigations of historical events. In addition to his non-fiction works, Larsen wrote books that are genre-wise close to Thorkild Hansen's trilogy on the history of the Danish slave trade. Furthermore, he studied over 100,000 Index cards from the Danish National Archives, Royal Library, and several museums.

== Personal life and death ==
Being described as a humble (stilfærdig) man, Larsen merely referred to himself as an author, and according to the Danish magazine Vikingen's editor-in-Chief, Axel Bærentzen, Larsen would have been uneasy with anyone calling him by his bynames. On 1 February 1917, he married Helen Maud Meyer in the Nazareth Church in Copenhagen. In 1919, he became Knight of the Dannebrog, additionally receiving the Medal of Merit in 1940.

=== Death ===
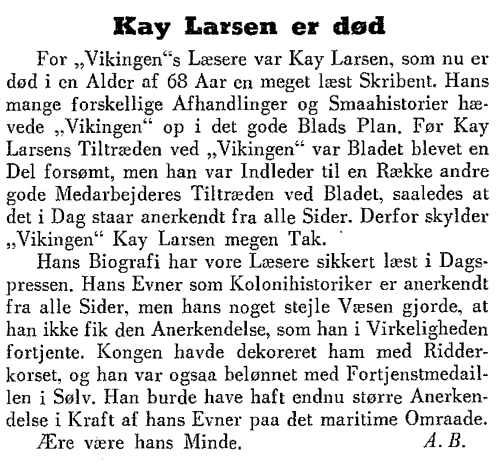
Obituary for Kay Larsen in the Danish Magazine Vikingen (The Viking) in 1947

Larsen died on 26 October 1947 aged 67. His death was mentioned in several Danish newspapers the subsequent day, including Berlingske Tidende, Nationaltidende, and Politiken.

== Legacy ==
=== Criticism ===
Larsen left large comprehensive works on Danish maritime and colonial history; nonetheless, later scholars have largely criticized the quality of Larsen's works. For instance, Hermann Lawaetz demonstrated many errors in his contributions to biographical history, while others pointed out many fallacies and inaccuracies and his lack of references and perspective.

=== Recognition ===
At the same time, Larsen's colonial studies were pioneering and caused Danish colonial history to be an established academic discipline later than it did in many other countries. In the Faroe Islands, Larsen became known as the Sjógugranskarin (lit. 'the Sea Researcher'), while the Minister for the Navy officially referred to him as "the Marine Historian".

As a result of being knighted in 1919, Larsen was included in Kraks Blå Bog. Furthermore, the Dansk Biografisk Haandleksikon, Dansk Biografisk Leksikon, and other foreign dictionaries include an entry for Larsen.

== Works ==
- De dansk-ostindiske Koloniers Historie – Trankebar; History of the Danish East Indian Colonies – Tranquebar (1907)
- De dansk-ostindiske Koloniers Historie – De Bengalske loger & Nikobarerne; History of the Danish East Indian Colonies – The Bengali Lodges & the Nicobar Islands (1908)
- Danmarks Kapervæsen 1807–14 (1915)
- De danske i Guinea; The Danes in Guinea (1918)
- Krøniker fra Trankebar; Chronicles from Tranquebar (1918)
- Fra Gentofte Sogn i gamle Dage; From Gentofte Parish in the Old Days (1927)
- Krøniker fra Guinea; Chronicles from Guinea (1927)
- Dansk Vestindien, 1666–1917; Danish West India (1928)
- Den danske Kinafart; The Danish China Trade (1932)

== Citations and references ==
=== References ===
- Engelstoft, Povl [in Danish]; Green-Pedersen, Svend (29 September 2014). "Kay Larsen". Dansk Biografisk Leksikon.
- Bærentzen, Axel (1938). "Forfatteren Kay Larsen" [The Author Kay Larsen] (PDF). Vikingen [The Viking] (in Danish). Vol. 15, no. 16 – via Marinehistorisk Selskab og Orlogsmuseets Venner.
