= Skirmish off Gingeli coast =

1644 Dano-Mughal War skirmish

- Part of the Dano-Mughal War
- A drawing of a smaller Bengali vessel, by Frans Balthazar Solvyns in 1799
Date	Late August 1644
Location	Off the Gingeli coast (present-day coast of Odisha, India)
Result	Danish victory

Belligerents
Danish India	Mughal Empire; Bengal Subah

Commanders and leaders
(Danish India) Jørgen Hansen (Danish India) Simon Jansen (Danish India) Poul Nielsen	Unk Nakhudas

Units involved
(Danish India) Valby (Danish India) Christianshavn	Unknown

Strength
2 ships 44 cannons Unknown no. of men (Note: Yachts usually had a crew of 40 men, with an additional 15 to 20 armed men.)	2 ship Unknown no. of men (Note: Larger Mughal ships usually had a crew of 100 men.)

Casualties and losses
Unknown	2 ships Great no. of men

The skirmish off Gingeli coast took place in late August 1644 off the Gingeli coast in Odisha between two Danish ships and two Bengali ships.

After the governor of the Danish colony of Tranquebar, Willem Leyel, resumed the Dano-Mughal War, two Danish ships were sent to Bengal to capture Bengali vessels as prizes. At the Gingeli coast, the ships skirmished with two large handelsskuder (single-decked merchant vessels), which ran aground after getting too close to the coast.

== Background ==
In 1616, the Danish East India Company was founded, and after a successful expedition to India in 1620, it established the colony of Tranquebar. Afterwards, the governor of Tranquebar, Roland Crappé, established multiple factories all over the East Indies, including Bengal, and Danish ships were regularly sent to India.

In late 1642, following continued disputes between Danish India and the Mughal Empire, the governor of Tranquebar, Bernt Pessart, declared war on the latter. After several successful expeditions to Bengal during the winter of 1643–1644, Pessart's successor, Willem Leyel, returned to Tranquebar in the summer of 1644.

=== Prelude ===
At the end of the summer, Leyel armed Danish India's best ships, the frigate Christianshavn and the yacht Valby, for an expedition to Bengal. On 22 August, Leyel appointed Jørgen Hansen Riber and Simon Jansen as commander-in-chief on Christianshavn and Valby respectively, while Poul Nielsen became second-in-command on the former ship. Additionally, Christianshavn was equipped with 28 cannons, while Valby had likely 16 cannons.

== Skirmish ==
On the same day as the appointments, the ships departed for Bengal, with Valby near the coast while Christianshavn was at a short distance. Off the Gingeli coast in Odisha, (Note: The Gingeli coast is synonymous with the coast of Odisha.) Valby hunted two large Bengali handelsskuder (single-decked merchant vessels) for some time, heavily firing cannonballs at them. Despite this, Valby was unable to overtake the ships, although Christianshavn heard the cannon shots and quickly approached the ships.

Upon seeing Christianshavn approaching, the Nakhudas of the Bengali ships lost their composure and, after seeing no possibility to escape, they steered the ships toward the coast, while they themselves fled in the ships' boats as the ships neared surf zone. Subsequently, the ships ran aground, (Note: American historian of Southeast Asia Kathryn Wellen asserts that Valby instead seized the ships.) furthermore being capsized and destroyed in the surf zone, which is described by a contemporary letter:

... the Bengali ships immediately smashed to pieces in the surf zone, and some of the elephants died, so that they suffered great loss ...

The elephants on board died in the skirmish, while others drowned in the subsequent grounding.

== Aftermath ==
Following the skirmish, the Danish ships quickly continued north, trying to reach Bengal faster than the rumors of the Danes coming, as the Mughal government likely had warned Bengali vessels of the Danes.

In September, the Danish ships were joined by Leyel himself on Fortuna, who captured St. Michael in the same month. Meanwhile, the other two Danish vessels patrolled Bengali waters the whole fall, only capturing a howker.

== See also ==
- Skirmish off Narsapur – 1643 Dano-Mughal War skirmish
- Action off Pipli River – 1644 Dano-Mughal War confrontation

== Notes and citations ==
=== References ===
- Larsen, Kay (1935). Ipsen, Poul (ed.). "En lille dansk Søkrig i Indien" [A Little Danish Naval War] (PDF). Tidsskrift for Søvæsen. 106. Copenhagen, Denmark: Søe-Lieutenant-Selskabet – via Marinehistorisk Selskab.
- Larsen, Kay (September 1907). Munch, Peter Rochegune (ed.). "Danske Kapertogter i den bengalske Havbugt" [Danish Privateer Voyages in the Bay of Bengal]. Det ny Aarhunderede. 4. Copenhagen, Denmark: Harvard Library – via Internet Archive.
- Larsen, Kay (1908). De dansk-ostindiske koloniers historie – De Bengalske loger & Nikobarerne [History of the Danish East Indian Colonies – The Bengali Lodges & the Nicobar Islands] (in Danish). Vol. 2. Copenhagen, Denmark: Centralforlaget – via Danskernes Historie Online.
- Wellen, Kathryn (2015). "The Danish East India Company's War against the Mughal Empire, 1642-1698" (PDF). Journal of Early Modern History. 19 (5). Leiden, the Netherlands: Brill Publishers: 439–461. doi:10.1163/15700658-12342470. eISSN 1568-5209. ISSN 0022-4995.
- Raychaudhuri, Tapan (1 January 1962). Jan Company in Coromandel 1605-1690 (PDF). Verhandelingen van het KITLV. Vol. 38 (1st ed.). The Hague, the Netherlands: Martinus Nijhoff Publishers. doi:10.26530/OAPEN_613323. ISBN 9789004286023.
