= Skirmish off Narsapur =

1643 Dano-Mughal War skirmish

- Part of the Dano-Mughal War
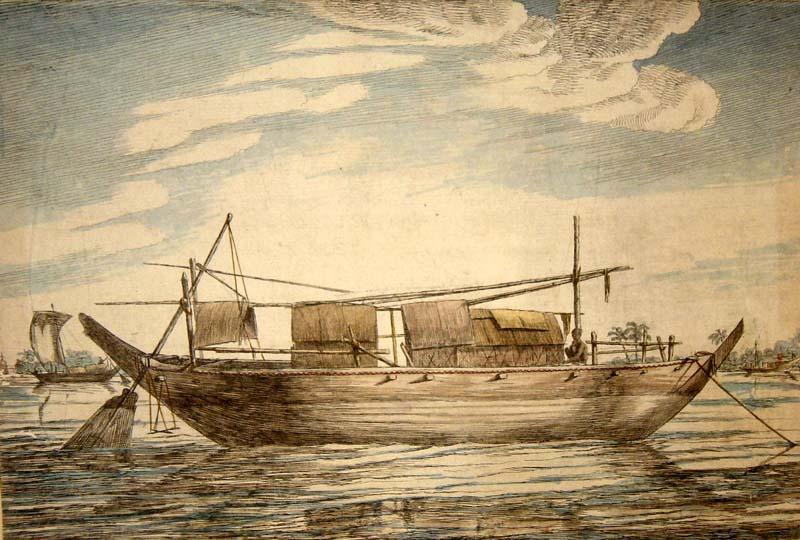
- A drawing of a smaller Bengali vessel, by Frans Balthazar Solvyns in 1799
| Date | 14 December 1643 |
| Location | Off Narsapur, Golconda (present-day Narasapuram, India) |
| Result | Danish victory |

Belligerents
| Danish India | Mughal Empire; Bengal Subah |

Commanders and leaders
| (Danish India) Willem Leyel | Jadche Jadgar (surrendered) |

Units involved
| (Danish India) Valby (Danish India) Christianshavn | Unknown |

Strength
| 2 ships Some cannons 140 men | 1 ship 9 cannons Unknown no. of men (Note: Larger Mughal ships usually had a crew of 100 men.) |

Casualties and losses
| Unknown | 1 ship 9 cannons Unknown no. of men |

The skirmish off Narsapur took place on 14 December 1643 at the road off Narsapur in Golconda between two Danish ships and one Bengali ship.

As the governor of the Danish colony of Tranquebar, Willem Leyel, resumed the Dano-Mughal War, two Danish ships were sent to Bengal to capture Bengali vessels as prizes. After a short skirmish at Narsapur Road, the ships captured a large skude (single-decked vessel), which they took to Emeldy in Golconda, where it was sold.

== Background ==
In 1616, the Danish East India Company was founded, and after a successful expedition to India in 1620, it established the colony of Tranquebar. Afterwards, the governor of Tranquebar, Roland Crappé, established multiple factories all over the East Indies, including Bengal, and Danish ships were regularly sent to India.

In late 1642, following continued disputes between Danish India and the Mughal Empire, the governor of Tranquebar, Bernt Pessart, declared war on the latter.

=== Prelude ===
In 1643, Pessart was ousted while he and his successor, Willem Leyel, overwintered in Emeldy in Golconda. Here, the frigate Christianshavn and the yacht Valby were repaired. In December of that year, as soon as Valby was ready to sail and the ship's council had approved it, Leyel sent it, together with Christianshavn, from Emeldy to Bengal to resume the war, being 140 in number.

== Skirmish ==
The ships got almost immediately lucky, as they captured a large Bengali skude (single-decked vessel) at the road off Narsapur on 14 December 1643. Being one and a half years old, the ship was led by the Nakhuda Jadche Jadgar and weighed 250 lasts (550 tonnes), with a cargo of iron.

Despite being armed with 1 jernbasse (small iron cannon) and 8 stenstykker (stone cannons), the European cannons were far superior, and the Bengali cannons did not help much. As a result, one of the Danish yachts managed to overtake the ship, which surrendered after minor resistance.

== Aftermath ==
=== Ship taken to Emeldy ===
Right after its capture, the ship was taken to Emeldy, where Christianshavn's council under Willem Leyel's presidency legally declared it a good prize and distributed prize money to the Danish privateers in accordance with the ship's articles issued by King Christian IV.

In the subsequent month, January 1644, Valby would again be sent to Bengal, where it captured another smaller ship, while Christianshavn captured Den lille Elefant among other ships in February. After the Danish ships again returned to Emeldy, they left for Tranquebar, yet the monsoon weather halted the Danes' voyage, and the two Danish vessels only returned to Tranquebar on 11 June 1644. According to Indian historian Lalit Mohan Mitra, the ship from Narsapur's road was taken with Leyel to Tranquebar, although Danish colonial historian Kay Larsen says the ship and most of its cargo were sold, possibly in Emeldy.

== See also ==
- Skirmish off Gingeli coast – 1644 Dano-Mughal War skirmish
- Mirza Mumin's assault – 1642 assualt of a Danish factory in Bengal

== Notes and citations ==
=== References ===
- Bredsdorff, Asta (1 January 1999). Willem Leyels liv og farefulde rejse til Indien [The Trials and Travels of Willem Leyel] (PDF). Søhistoriske Skifter. Vol. 21. Copenhagen, Denmark: Museum Tusculanum Press. ISBN 87-7289-498-9. ISSN 0107-6647.
- Larsen, Kay (1935). Ipsen, Poul (ed.). "En lille dansk Søkrig i Indien" [A Little Danish Naval War] (PDF). Tidsskrift for Søvæsen. 106. Copenhagen, Denmark: Søe-Lieutenant-Selskabet – via Marinehistorisk Selskab.
- Larsen, Kay (1907). De dansk-ostindiske koloniers historie – Trankebar [History of the Danish East Indian Colonies – Tranquebar] (in Danish). Vol. 1. Copenhagen, Denmark: Centralforlaget – via Danskernes Historie Online.
- Larsen, Kay (1908). De dansk-ostindiske koloniers historie – De Bengalske loger & Nikobarerne [History of the Danish East Indian Colonies – The Bengali Lodges & the Nicobar Islands] (in Danish). Vol. 2. Copenhagen, Denmark: Centralforlaget – via Danskernes Historie Online.
- Wellen, Kathryn (2015). "The Danish East India Company's War against the Mughal Empire, 1642-1698" (PDF). Journal of Early Modern History. 19 (5). Leiden, the Netherlands: Brill Publishers: 439–461. doi:10.1163/15700658-12342470. eISSN 1568-5209. ISSN 0022-4995.
- Mitra, Lalit Mohan (September 1952). The Danes in Bengal (PDF) (1st ed.). Kolkata, India: Prabartak Publishers. p. 15 – via Internet Archive.
