= Capture of Den Lille Elefant =

1644 Dano-Mughal War confrontation

- Part of the Dano-Mughal War
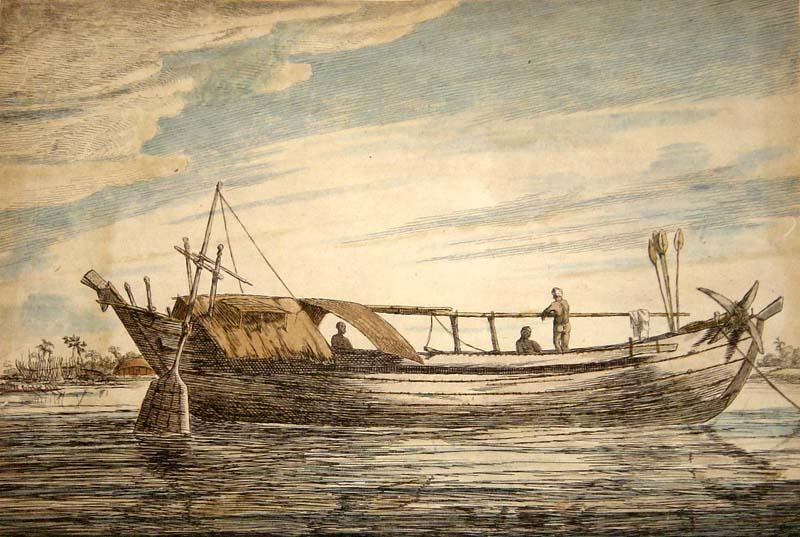
- A drawing of a smaller Bengali vessel, by Frans Balthazar Solvyns in 1799
Date	February 1644
Location	Bay of Bengal
Result	Danish victory

Belligerents
Danish India	Mughal Empire; Bengal Subah

Commanders and leaders
(Danish India) Willem Leyel (Danish India) Hans Knudsen	Unknown

Units involved
(Danish India) Christianshavn	Den Lille Elefant (Note: Name given to the ship after its capture.)

Strength
1 ship	1 ship Unknown no. of men (Note: Larger Mughal ships usually had a crew of 100 men.)

Casualties and losses
Unknown	1 ship Unknown no. of men

The capture of Den Lille Elefant (transl. The Little Elephant) by a Danish frigate took place in February 1644 in the Bay of Bengal.

After the governor of the Danish colony of Tranquebar, Willem Leyel, resumed the Dano-Mughal War by capturing a Bengali skude (single-decked vessel) off Narsapur, another expedition to Bengal was initiated. Here, a Danish frigate captured a large Bengali one, which was taken to Corengy and incorporated into the Danish fleet in India.

== Background ==
In 1616, the Danish East India Company was founded, and after a successful expedition to India in 1620, it established the colony of Tranquebar. Afterwards, the governor of Tranquebar, Roland Crappé, established multiple factories all over the East Indies, including Bengal, and Danish ships were regularly sent to India.

In late 1642, following continued disputes between Danish India and the Mughal Empire, the governor of Tranquebar, Bernt Pessart, declared war on the latter.

=== Prelude ===
In 1643, Pessart was ousted while he and his successor, Willem Leyel, overwintered in Emeldy in Golconda. Here, the frigate Christianshavn and the yacht Valby were repaired, and when Valby was ready to sail, it and Christianshavn, was sent to Bengal to resume the war. During their expedition, they managed to capture a skude (single-decked vessel) off Narsapur in December 1643.

== Capture ==
In February 1644, a new expedition was initiated by Christianshavn, under which a large Bengali frigate, later named Den Lille Elefant (transl. The Little Elephant), was captured.

The ship was coming home from Achin on Sumatra, weighed 180 lasts, and had three masts. Among other things from the Sunda Islands, it had a cargo consisting of spices, rice, and 4 valuable Achenese elephants, (Note: Danish author Asta Bredsdorff puts this number at 5.) which were ordered from Sumatra by the sultan of Golconda. Willem Leyel quickly sent the ship to Masulipatnam under escort. From here, the elephants were transported inland and given to the sultan as a Danish gift.

== Aftermath ==
=== Ship taken to Corengy ===
From Masulipatnam, the ship was subsequently taken to shipyard in Corengy, where Leyel's appointed captain of the ship, Hans Knudsen, was tasked with repairing it and arming it with cannons. Renamed Den Lille Elefant, the ship itself was incorporated into the Danish fleet in India; however, while being repaired, a storm smashed it to pieces on a reef.

Concurrent with Christianshavn's expedition, Valby had captured a smaller ship in January, and after returning to Emeldy, the Danish ships left for Tranquebar. Nevertheless, the monsoon weather halted the Danes' voyage, and the two Danish vessels only returned to Tranquebar on 11 June 1644.

== See also ==
- Capture of Den Bengalske Prise – 1642 Dano-Mughal War confrontation
- Capture of the St. Michael – 1644 Danish capture of a Bengali ship

== Notes and citations ==
=== References ===
- Bredsdorff, Asta (1 January 1999). Willem Leyels liv og farefulde rejse til Indien [The Trials and Travels of Willem Leyel] (PDF). Søhistoriske Skifter. Vol. 21. Copenhagen, Denmark: Museum Tusculanum Press. ISBN 87-7289-498-9. ISSN 0107-6647.
- Larsen, Kay (1907). De dansk-ostindiske koloniers historie – Trankebar [History of the Danish East Indian Colonies – Tranquebar] (in Danish). Vol. 1. Copenhagen, Denmark: Centralforlaget – via Danskernes Historie Online.
- Larsen, Kay (1908). De dansk-ostindiske koloniers historie – De Bengalske loger & Nikobarerne [History of the Danish East Indian Colonies – The Bengali Lodges & the Nicobar Islands] (in Danish). Vol. 2. Copenhagen, Denmark: Centralforlaget – via Danskernes Historie Online.
- Larsen, Kay (1935). Ipsen, Poul (ed.). "En lille dansk Søkrig i Indien" [A Little Danish Naval War] (PDF). Tidsskrift for Søvæsen. 106. Copenhagen, Denmark: Søe-Lieutenant-Selskabet – via Marinehistorisk Selskab.
- Wellen, Kathryn (2015). "The Danish East India Company's War against the Mughal Empire, 1642-1698" (PDF). Journal of Early Modern History. 19 (5). Leiden, the Netherlands: Brill Publishers: 439–461. doi:10.1163/15700658-12342470. eISSN 1568-5209. ISSN 0022-4995.
