= Capture of Den Bengalske Prise =

1642 Dano-Mughal War confrontation

- Part of the Dano-Mughal War
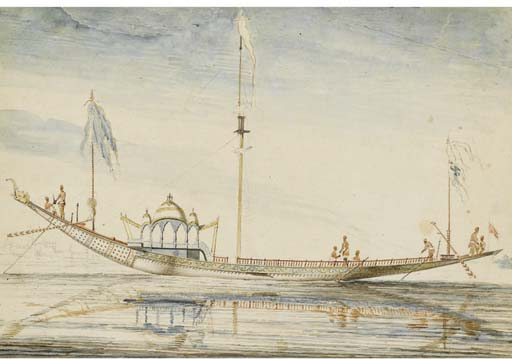
- A drawing of a smaller Bengali vessel, by Frans Balthazar Solvyns in 1799
Date	Late 1642 (Note: Danish colonial historian Kay Larsen noted that the capture could also have taken place in early 1643.)
Location	Bay of Bengal
Result	Danish victory

Belligerents
Danish India	Mughal Empire; Bengal Subah

Commanders and leaders
(Danish India) Bernt Pessart	Unknown

Units involved
(Danish India) Fortuna (Danish India) Valby	Den Bengalske Prise (Note: Name given to the ship after its capture.)

Strength
2 ships Unknown no. of men (Note: Yachts usually had a crew of 40 men, with an additional 15 to 20 armed men.)	1 ship Unknown no. of men (Note: Larger Mughal ships usually had a crew of 100 men.)

Casualties and losses
Unknown	1 ship Unknown no. of men

The capture of Den Bengalske Prise (transl. The Bengali Prize) by two Danish yachts took place in late 1642 in the Bay of Bengal.

Following the governor of the Danish colony of Tranquebar, Bernt Pessart's, declaration of war against the Mughal Empire in late 1642, two Danish yachts were sent to Bengal to capture Bengali vessels as prizes. Here, the Danish expedition was successful, and a large, valuable sampan, renamed Den Bengalske Prise, was captured and incorporated into the Danish fleet in India.

== Background ==
In 1616, the Danish East India Company was founded, and after a successful expedition to India in 1620, it established the colony of Tranquebar. Afterwards, the governor of Tranquebar, Roland Crappé, established multiple factories all over the East Indies, including Bengal, and Danish ships were regularly sent to India.

=== Prelude ===
In late 1642, following continued disputes between Danish India and the Mughal Empire, the governor of Tranquebar, Bernt Pessart, declared war on the latter. Quickly after the declaration of war, a couple of Danish India's best yachts, Fortuna and Valby, were armed with cannons and men and sent to Bengal to initiate the war as privateers.

== Capture ==
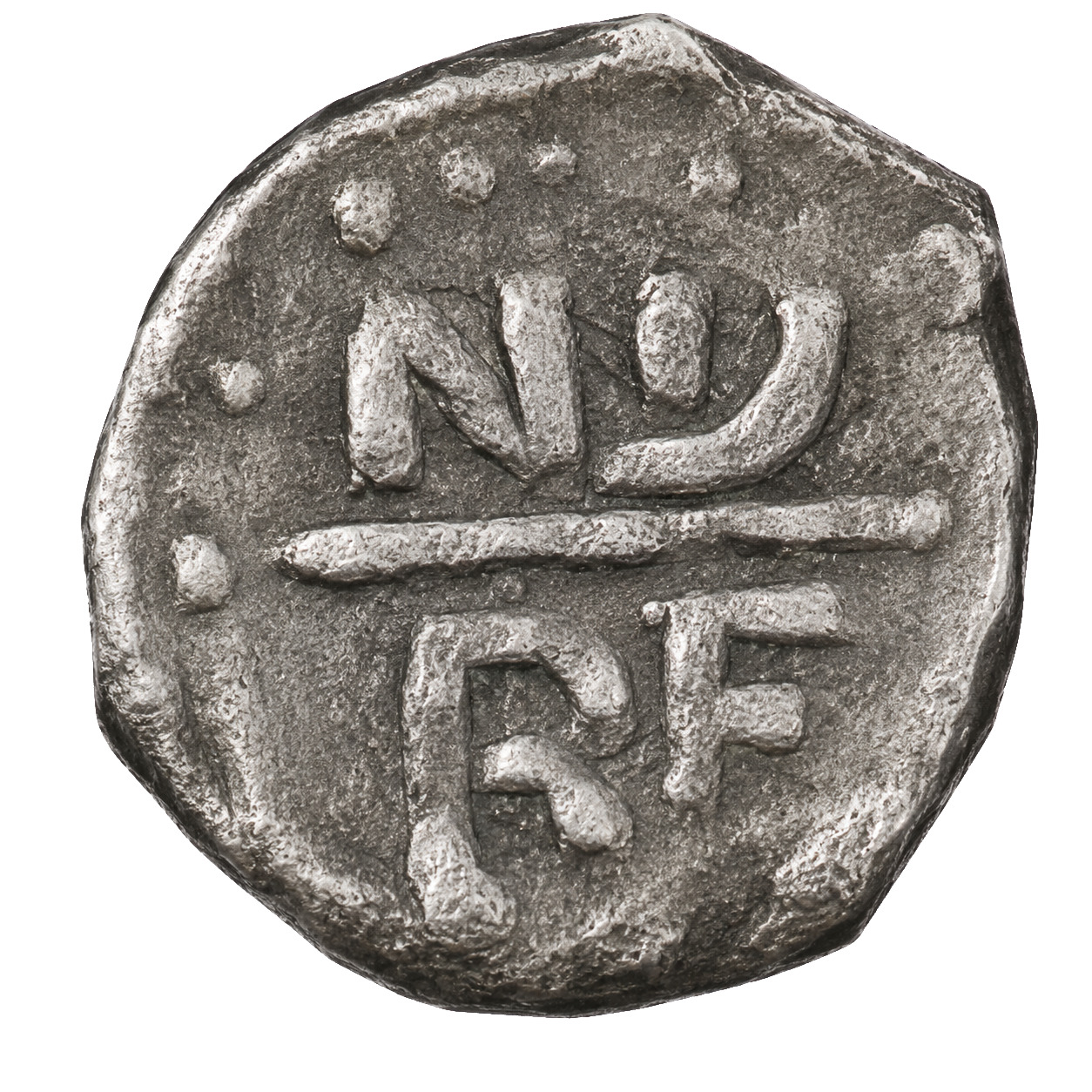
A coin with the inscription NIS BE, in which BE could stand for Bengal. In that case, it could refer to Den Bengalske Prise

Although records from this year are sparse, Danish colonial historian Kay Larsen noted that the expedition was likely successful. Nonetheless, the only information known is that the large, valuable sampan, later named Den Bengalske Prise (transl. The Bengali Prize), was captured from the Great Mughal by the Danes at the end of 1642.

=== Claus Rytter account ===
According to Dutch historians and numismatists Jan Lingen and Jan Lucassen, Den forgyldte Sol undertook the expedition that captured Den Bengalske Prise. This took place in April 1642, and Claus Rytter led the expedition. Nevertheless, this version is inconsistent with Danish author Asta Bredsdorff's, who mentions Rytter in the same timespan as conducting a voyage to the port of Bantam on Den forgyldte Sol.

== Aftermath ==
=== Ship taken to Tranquebar ===
The ship was subsequently brought to Tranquebar, where its cargo was sold, giving large profits. The ship itself was incorporated into the Danish fleet in India and armed with cannons from Fort Dansborg. Renamed Den Bengalske Prise, the ship would serve the D.E.I.C. for some years.

The war would be resumed at the arrival of Willem Leyel, with several successful expeditions to Bengal during the winter of 1643–1644.

== See also ==
- Capture of Den Lille Elefant – 1642 Dano-Mughal War skirmish
- Action off Pipli River – 1644 Dano-Mughal War confrontation
- Capture of the St. Michael – 1644 Danish capture of a Bengali ship

== Notes and citations ==
=== References ===
- Bredsdorff, Asta (1 January 1999). Willem Leyels liv og farefulde rejse til Indien [The Trials and Travels of Willem Leyel] (PDF). Søhistoriske Skifter. Vol. 21. Copenhagen, Denmark: Museum Tusculanum Press. ISBN 87-7289-498-9. ISSN 0107-6647.
- Larsen, Kay (1935). Ipsen, Poul (ed.). "En lille dansk Søkrig i Indien" [A Little Danish Naval War] (PDF). Tidsskrift for Søvæsen. 106. Copenhagen, Denmark: Søe-Lieutenant-Selskabet – via Marinehistorisk Selskab.
- Larsen, Kay (1907). De dansk-ostindiske koloniers historie – Trankebar [History of the Danish East Indian Colonies – Tranquebar] (in Danish). Vol. 1. Copenhagen, Denmark: Centralforlaget – via Danskernes Historie Online.
- Larsen, Kay (1908). De dansk-ostindiske koloniers historie – De Bengalske loger & Nikobarerne [History of the Danish East Indian Colonies – The Bengali Lodges & the Nicobar Islands] (in Danish). Vol. 2. Copenhagen, Denmark: Centralforlaget – via Danskernes Historie Online.
- Lingen, Jan; Lucassen, Jan (1 January 2007). Amiteshwar, Jha; Sanjay, Garg (eds.). "The 'Mansuri' or 'Munsooree Paisa and its Use: Combining Numismatic and Social History of India, c. 1830-1900". Numismatic Digest. 31 (1st ed.). Mumbai, India: Indian Institute for Research in Numismatic Studies: 226. ASIN B0062V9A84. ISBN 978-8186786260.
