= Willem Leyel's war on Golconda =

1640s minor war in India

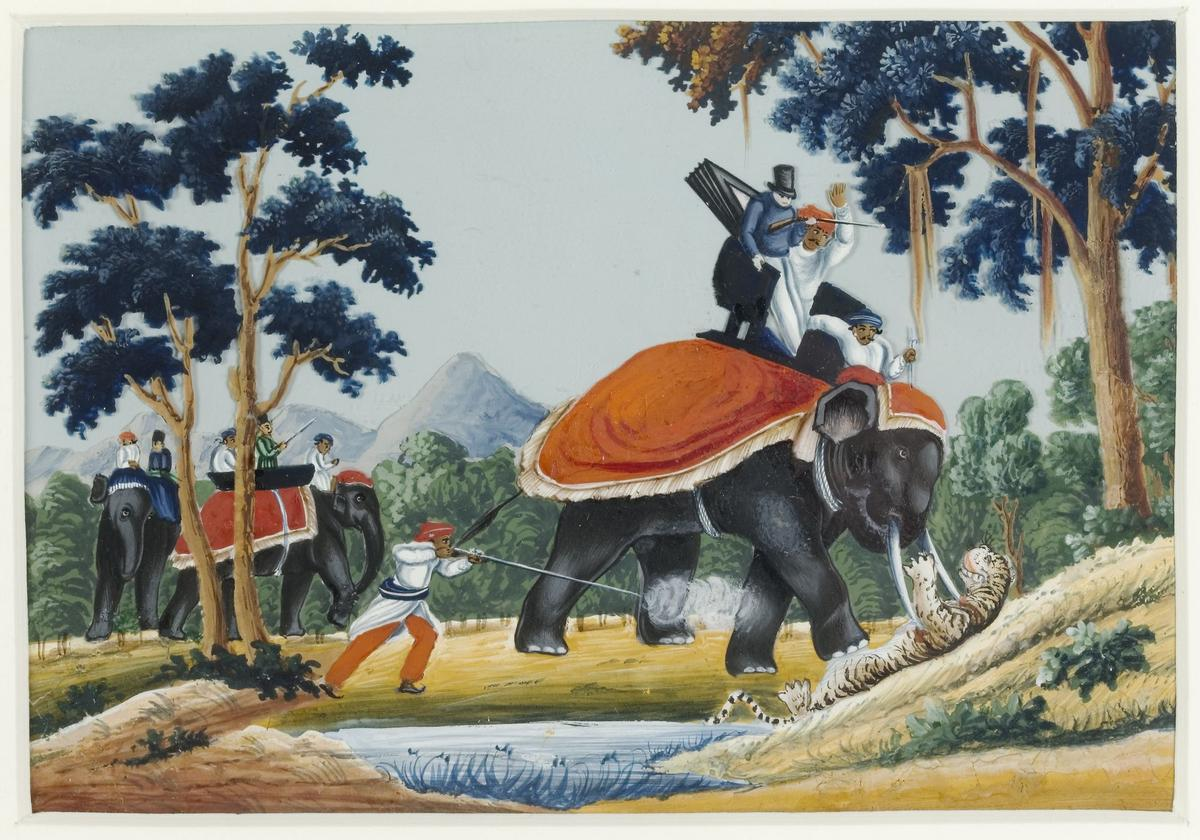
- Elephant hunt in Danish Tranquebar, presumably early 19th century.
Date	c. 1645
Location	Coromandel Coast
Result	Danish victory
Territorial changes	Status quo ante bellum

Belligerents
Danish India	Golconda Sultanate

Commanders and leaders
(Danish India) Willem Leyel	Abdullah Qutb

Units involved
(Danish India) Christianshavn	Unknown

Strength
Unk. amount of ships	Unk. amount of ships

Casualties and losses
Negligible	Some ships

Willem Leyel's war on Golconda (Danish: Willem Leyels krig mod Golconda), or simply the Dano-Golconda War (Danish: Dansk-Golcondanske Krig), was a brief privateering war between the Sultanate of Golkonda and the Danish East India Company led by Willem Leyel. The hostilities quickly resulted in a peace treaty and the two parties would soon reconcile.

== Background ==
During Bernt Pessart's time as overhoved of Danish India, Masulipatnam was the centre of the cotton trade and Pessart would rather prefer residing in Masulipatnam than Tranquebar. Masulipatnam was originally an unimportant fishing village located in the Sultanate of Golconda, however, in the 17th century its commercial importance began to grow, and the Danes established a factory there.

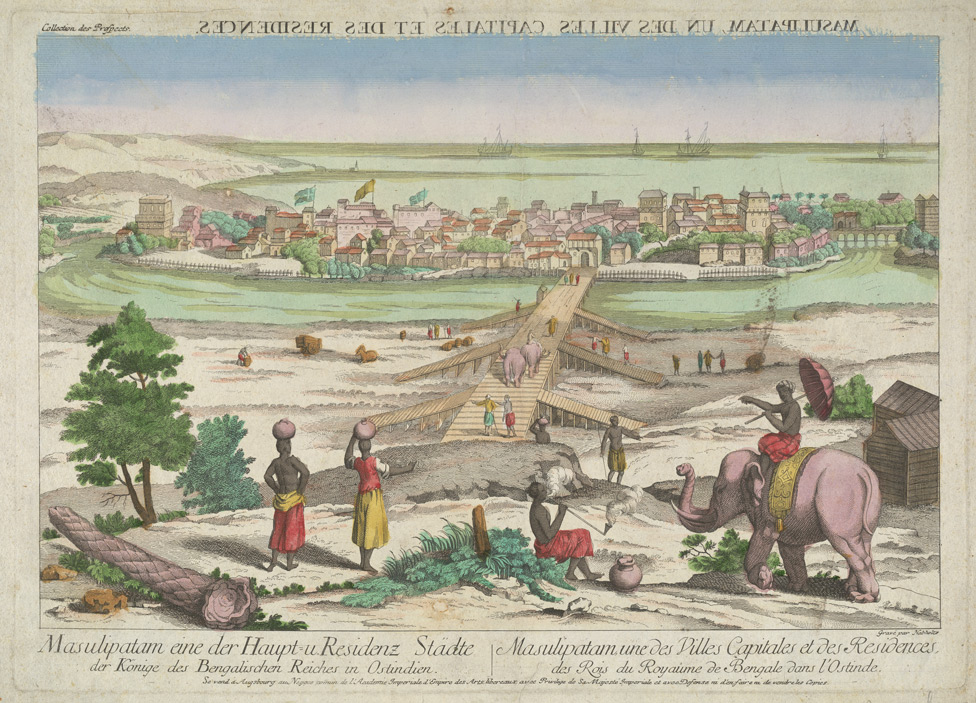
View of Masulipatam in 1676. Roland Crappé (admin. 1621–1636) made Masulipatam the centre for the company's trade, and Bernt Pessart additionally made it the official headquarters.

== Prelude ==
Initially, the relations with the local sultan remained stable, and he had been eager to acquire cloves from the Danish Company. However, as the company's finances suffered, the relations would deteriorate. By 1638, Pessart's debts in the trading town amounted to 35,000 pagodas. In 1639 Dutch, English, and Danish agents in Masulipatnam had been ordered to present the sultan with a gift of 600,000 pagodas. When the Danes could not deliver this, their trading post was ransacked. In 1640, the St. Jacob wrecked off Masulipatnam. It was a serious blow to the company, and led Pessart's creditors to demand his imprisonment.

Because of the financial situation, Christian IV sent Captain Willem Leyel to Dansborg to investigate the company's affairs. When Leyel arrived he assumed Pessart's leadership, however, the conditions in Masulipatnam was still at place.

== War ==
The disordered state of affairs with regard to trade with the Sultanate of Golconda continued, and Leyel was finally forced to declare war on Golconda. Leyel initiated a blockade of Masulipatnam, the biggest trading town in the Sultanate, and launched privateering ventures to the Coromandel Coast. These ventures eventually led to the capture and seizure of a couple of Golcondian ships. As a result, Leyel and the Golcondian sultan, Abdullah Qutb Shah, would agree to a peaceful settlement. This settlement was favorable to Danish India.

== Aftermath ==
This peace settlement put an end to the lucrative market, in which the Danish officers had been involved, and it may be assumed that this settlement caused a mutiny in Tranquebar in 1648.

== See also ==
- Dano-Mughal War – Danish colonial conflict against the Mughal Empire
- Bernt Pessart – 17th-century Danish governor and president of Danish India from 1636–1643
- Golconda diamonds mining and trading – Commerce involving Indian diamonds
- Dano-Mughal Treaty – Treaty between the Mughal Empire and Denmark-Norway

== Works cited ==
- Bredsdorff, Asta (2009). The Trials and Travels of Willem Leyel. Copenhagen: Museum Tusculanum Press. ISBN 9788763530231.
- Sethuraman, N. (2016). The Danish East India Company From Establishment To The Epilogue (1616 – 1729) - A Historical Perspective. Salem: Tamil Nadu History Congress Proceedings.
- Wirta, K.H. (2018). Dark horses of business : overseas entrepreneurship in seventeenthcentury Nordic trade in the Indian and Atlantic oceans. Universiteit Leiden.
- Larsen, Kay (1907). De dansk-ostindiske koloniers historie – Trankebar [History of the Danish East Indian Colonies – Tranquebar] (in Danish). Vol. 1. Copenhagen, Denmark: Centralforlaget – via Danskernes Historie Online.
