= Action off Pipli River =

1644 Dano-Mughal War confrontation

- Part of the Dano-Mughal War
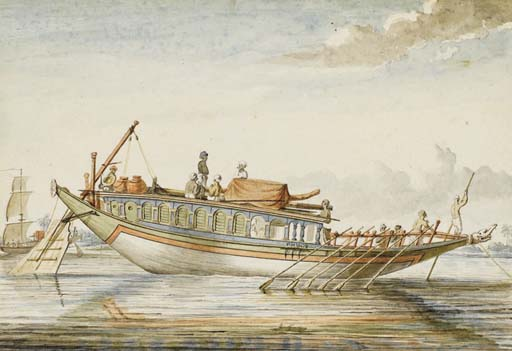
- A drawing of a budgerow, by Frans Balthazar Solvyns in 1799
Date	21 January 1644
Location	Mouth of the Pipli River, Mughal Empire (present-day Subarnarekha River, India) 21°33′18″N 87°23′31″E
Result	Danish victory

Belligerents
Danish India	Mughal Empire; Bengal Subah

Commanders and leaders
(Danish India) Willem Leyel	Abdul Gany (POW)

Units involved
(Danish India) Valby	Unknown

Strength
1 ship Unknown no. of men (Note: Yachts usually had a crew of 40 men, with an additional 15 to 20 armed men.)	1 ship Unknown no. of men

Casualties and losses
Unknown	1 ship 19 slaves captured

The action off Pipli River took place on 21 January 1644 at the mouth of the Pipli River in Bengal between a Danish yacht and a Bengali ship.

After the governor of the Danish colony of Tranquebar, Willem Leyel, resumed the Dano-Mughal War by capturing a Bengali skude (single-decked vessel) off Narsapur, another expedition to Bengal was initiated. At the mouth of the Pipli River, a Danish yacht captured a small ship, which was taken to Emeldy in Golconda, where it was sold.

== Background ==
In 1616, the Danish East India Company was founded, and after a successful expedition to India in 1620, it established the colony of Tranquebar. Afterwards, the governor of Tranquebar, Roland Crappé, established multiple factories all over the East Indies, including Bengal, and Danish ships were regularly sent to India.

In late 1642, following continued disputes between Danish India and the Mughal Empire, the governor of Tranquebar, Bernt Pessart, declared war on the latter.

=== Prelude ===
In 1643, Pessart was ousted while he and his successor, Willem Leyel, overwintered in Emeldy in Golconda. Here, the frigate Christianshavn and the yacht Valby were repaired, and when Valby was ready to sail, it and Christianshavn, was sent to Bengal to resume the war. During their expedition, they managed to capture a skude (single-decked vessel) off Narsapur in December 1643.

== Action ==
In January 1644, a new expedition was initiated by Valby, under which a small Bengali ship was captured at the mouth of the Pipli River on 21 January.

The ship was coming down from Pipli city, weighed 40 lasts and had a large valuable cargo consisting of ambergris, 21 packages of pepper, Bengali textiles, and Chinese silk. The Nakhuda of the ship, Abdul Gany, 6 Mughal merchants, and the crew were subsequently imprisoned and taken to Fort Dansborg. Meanwhile, their slaves, 19 in total, (Note: Danish author Asta Bredsdorff puts this number at 34.) were baptised and sold, the majority of whom were children. The Danes carefully recorded a list of all of the slaves by their baptismal name:

- List of Danish slaves
- 1 slave girl baptised Maria (12–13 years old)
- 1 slave boy baptised Matthæus (9–10 years old)
- 1 slave boy baptised Juan (7–8 years old)
- 1 slave boy baptised Bartholomæus (6–7 years old)
- 1 slave woman baptised Catharine (22–23 years old)
- 1 slave boy baptised Jørgen (3 years old)
- 1 slave woman (17–18 years old)

== Aftermath ==
Concurrent with Valby's expedition, Christianshavn had captured Den Lille Elefant among other ships in February, and after returning to Emeldy with the ship from the Pipli River, where the ship and most of its cargo were sold, the Danish ships left for Tranquebar. Danish colonial historian Kay Larsen is inconsistent about the date of Danes' departure, placing it in both early January and February 1644. As such, in the account placing it in early January, the Bengali ship is captured while the Danes scouted for Bengali vessels, as they were returning to Tranquebar. Nevertheless, the monsoon weather halted the Danes' voyage, and the two Danish vessels only returned to Tranquebar on 11 June 1644.

== See also ==
- Attack in Hooghly – 1671 Danish attack on Bengali vessels in Hooghly
- Grounding of the Nattergalen – 1626 grounding of a Danish ship
- Grounding of the St. Jacob – 1640 grounding of a Danish ship

== Notes and citations ==
=== References ===
- Bredsdorff, Asta (1 January 1999). Willem Leyels liv og farefulde rejse til Indien [The Trials and Travels of Willem Leyel] (PDF). Søhistoriske Skifter. Vol. 21. Copenhagen, Denmark: Museum Tusculanum Press. ISBN 87-7289-498-9. ISSN 0107-6647.
- Larsen, Kay (September 1907a). Munch, Peter Rochegune (ed.). "Danske Kapertogter i den bengalske Havbugt" [Danish Privateer Voyages in the Bay of Bengal]. Det ny Aarhunderede. 4. Copenhagen, Denmark: Harvard Library – via Internet Archive.
- Larsen, Kay (1907b). De dansk-ostindiske koloniers historie – Trankebar [History of the Danish East Indian Colonies – Tranquebar] (in Danish). Vol. 1. Copenhagen, Denmark: Centralforlaget – via Danskernes Historie Online.
- Larsen, Kay (1935). Ipsen, Poul (ed.). "En lille dansk Søkrig i Indien" [A Little Danish Naval War] (PDF). Tidsskrift for Søvæsen. 106. Copenhagen, Denmark: Søe-Lieutenant-Selskabet – via Marinehistorisk Selskab.
- Wellen, Kathryn (2015). "The Danish East India Company's War against the Mughal Empire, 1642-1698" (PDF). Journal of Early Modern History. 19 (5). Leiden, the Netherlands: Brill Publishers: 439–461. doi:10.1163/15700658-12342470. eISSN 1568-5209. ISSN 0022-4995.
