= Christianshavn Incident =

1640 naval incident

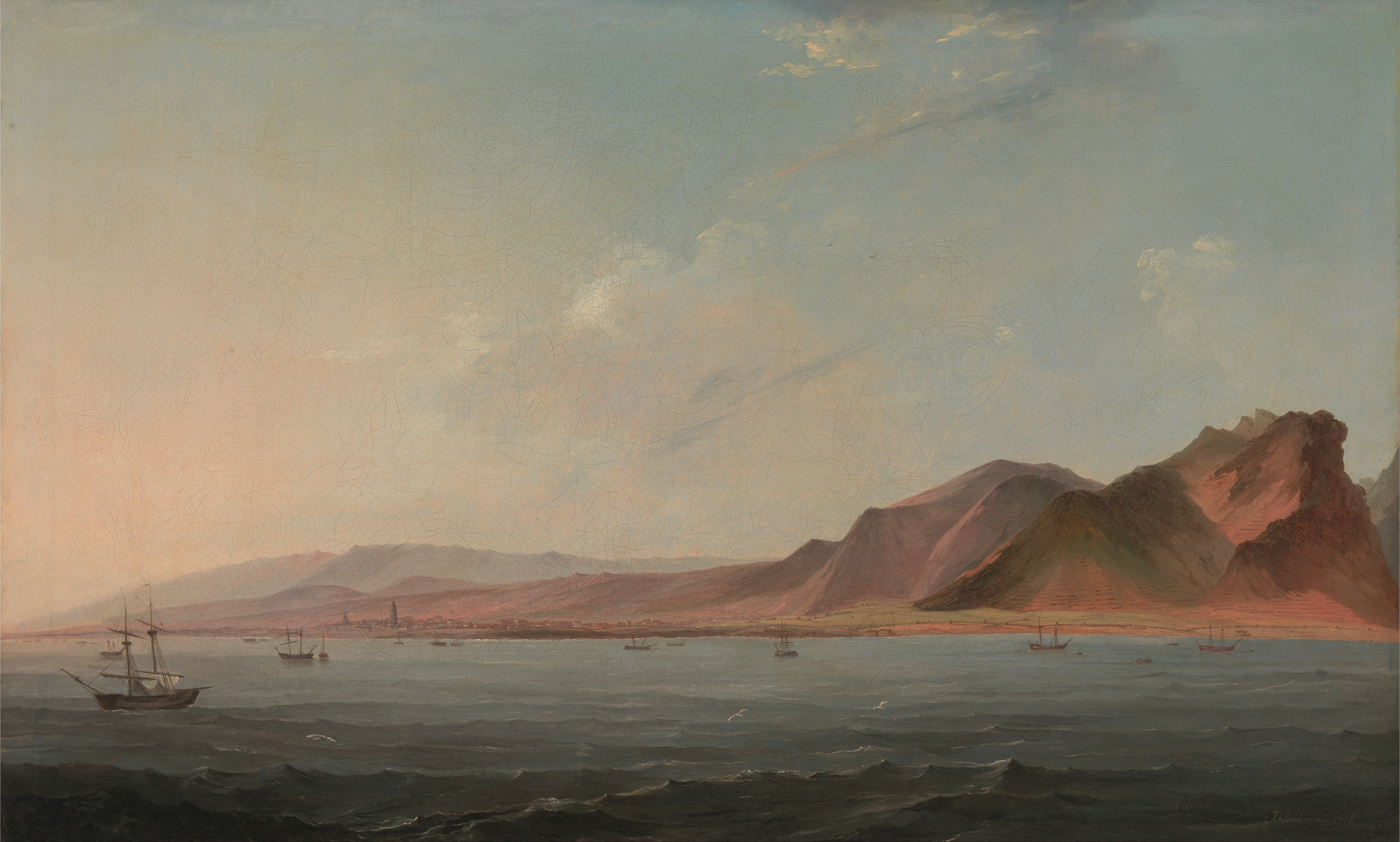
- View of Santa Cruz, Tenerife, 1776, by John Webber
Date	5 March 1640
Location	Santa Cruz, Canary Islands 28°28′N 16°15′W
Result	Spanish victory

Belligerents
Spanish Empire	Denmark-Norway

Commanders and leaders
(Spanish Empire) Unk. captain (Spanish Empire) Unk. commander	(Denmark–Norway) Willem Leyel (surrendered) (Denmark–Norway) Carsten Ludvigsen

Units involved
(Spanish Empire) San Cristóbal garrison	(Denmark–Norway) Christianshavn

Strength
1 ship Multiple guns	1 ship 22 men

Casualties and losses
None	1 ship damaged and confiscated

The Christianshavn Incident (Danish: Christianshavnhændelsen, Spanish: Christianopuerto Incidente (Note: After her capture, Christianshavn was renamed to Christianopuerto by the Spaniards.)), also known as the Skirmish at Santa Cruz (Danish: Træfningen ved Santa Cruz), was a minor incident and skirmish between Danish and Spanish military assets near Santa Cruz de Tenerife in Spain. The Danish vessel, Christianshavn, was badly wounded and the Danes had to retreat into harbour, where they would be detained.

== Background ==
In 1639, Christian IV of Denmark sent experienced trader Willem Leyel with the ship Christianshavn to India to investigate current reports about the Danish East India Company's dire financial situation.

=== Prelude ===
However, on 5 March 1640, upon reaching Santa Cruz, Leyel and his men were inspected by the Spanish, who were skeptical of other European nations trading and colonizing India. When the Spaniards approached the ship, they demanded that the captain step ashore and explain where they were heading. By afternoon, the Spanish also demanded Leyel to step ashore, though Leyel explained that it was too late and that he would remain on board that night.

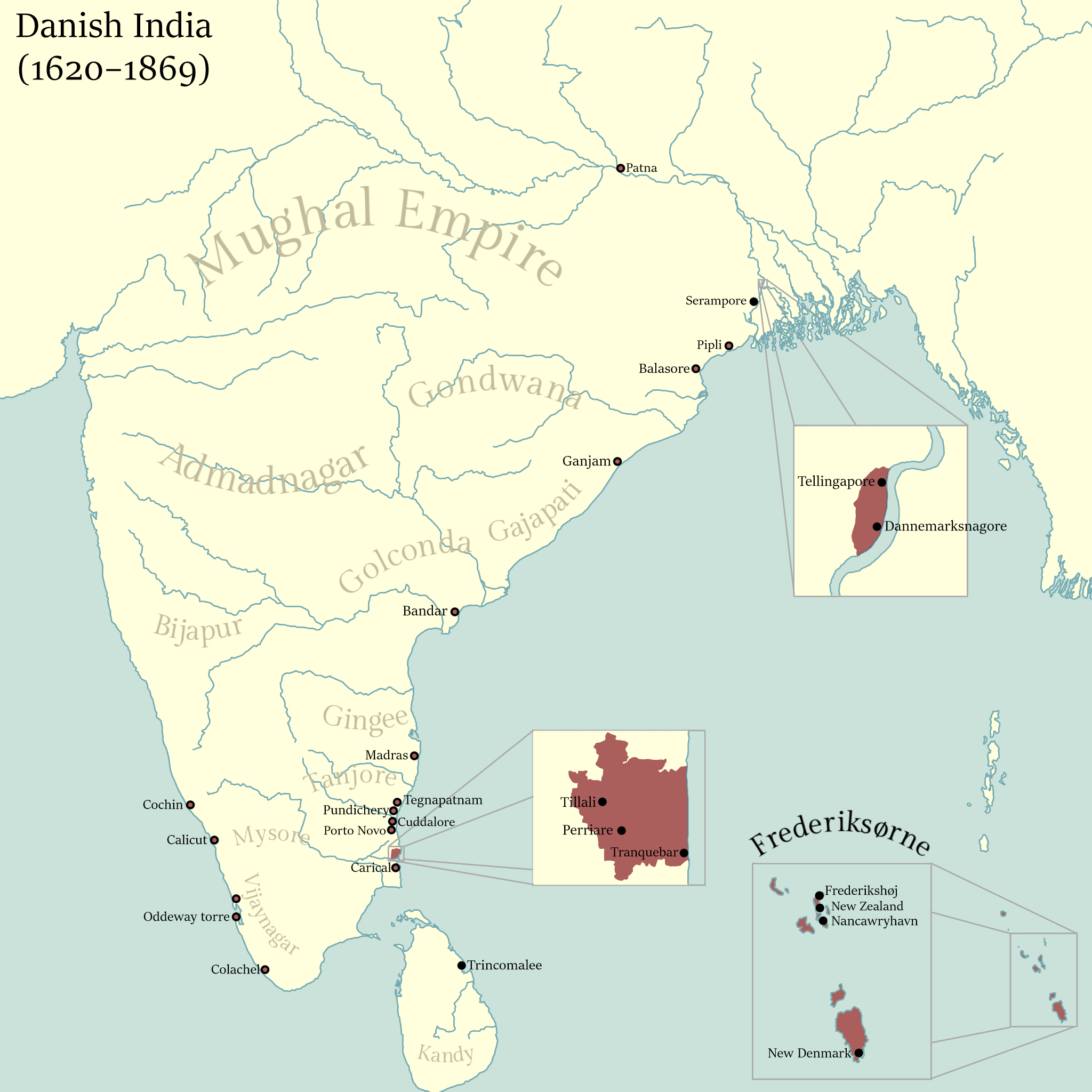
Map of Danish India, including factories. The Spaniards were opposed to letting other nations colonize the Orient because of the Inter caetera.

However, Leyel had already finalized a plan to escape the harbour so his arrival at Danish India would not be further delayed.

== Incident ==
At night when the town and garrison at the Castle of San Cristóbal seemed to be asleep, the Danes manned two boats and equipped them with towropes. Since heaving the anchor would make too much noise, the two boats were intended to help the ship get under sail.

For some time, their escape seemed promising, but suddenly the Danes saw soldiers with burning torches on the ramparts. The Spanish soldiers shouted commands at the Danes and shortly after fired cannon shots at them. The first cannon shot struck off a piece of the mizzenmast, the second made a hole in the ship two feet above the waterline, a third removed a large piece of the yard and a fourth shot made a hole only one foot above the waterline. Christianshavn was also shot from the other side by a Spanish ship but with minor damages inflicted.

Leyel had also forbidden his men to shoot. The reason being that if their escape did not succeed, they would be guilty of firing at a royal Spanish fortress. When it became clear that there was no hope of escaping, Leyel gave orders to hoist the white flag and surrender. On seeing this, the Spanish sent a captain on board and demanded that Leyel and his men come ashore immediately.

== Aftermath ==
Leyel and his men were now escorted up to the commander of Fort San Cristóbal, where he sought to hand over King Christian's pass, to prove that he sailed legitimately. However, the Spanish commander refused to listen and sent the Danes to La Laguna. Leyel would struggle with the Spanish for almost three more years, until he finally, on 2 March 1643, could sail off to India.

== Works cited ==
- Bredsdorff, Asta (1999). Søhistoriske Skrifter (PDF) (in Danish). Vol. XXI. Copenhagen: Handels- og Søfartsmuseet Kronborg.
- Bredsdorff, Asta (2009). The Trials and Travels of Willem Leyel. Copenhagen: Museum Tusculanum Press. ISBN 9788763530231.
