= Jan Lucassen =

Dutch social historian

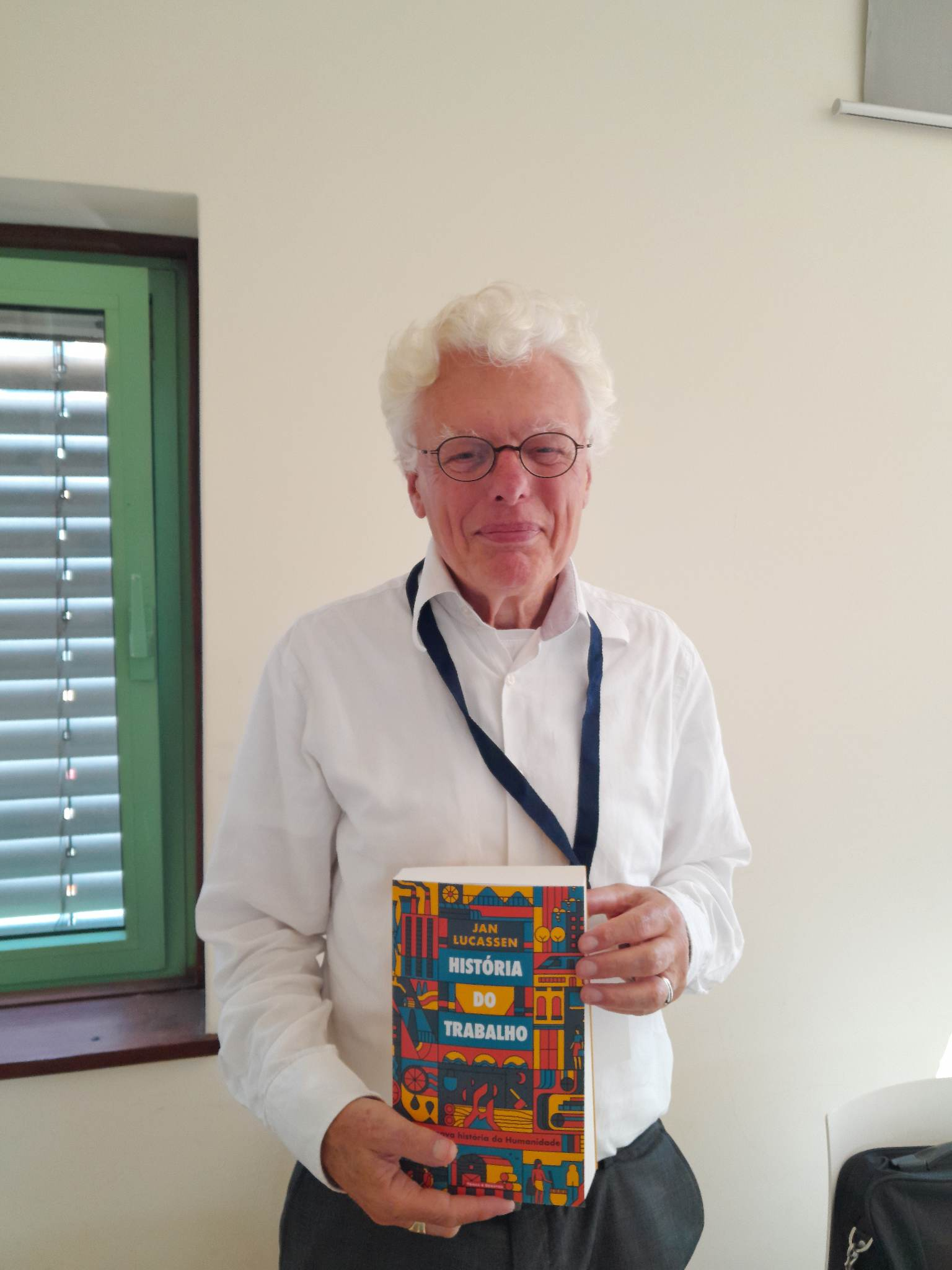
Jan Lucassen with a Portuguese edition of his book "The Story of Work"

Johannes Mathias Wilhelmus Gerardus Lucassen (born 7 July 1947) is a Dutch historian. He studied history at Leiden University and obtained his PhD at Utrecht University in 1984 with Migrant Labour in Europe 1600-1900. The Drift to the North Sea (London, 1987). He specializes in the history of labour, the long-term development of labour relations, migration and monetisation in relation to the development of wage labour.

== Research ==
In 1988 he joined the International Institute of Social History (IISH), where he set up the research department, and was IISH's Research Director until the end of 2000. Since then, he has been a Senior Research Fellow at the IISH and an Honorary Fellow since 2012. He is a member of the Royal Netherlands Academy of Arts and Sciences since 2004. From 1990 until his retirement in 2012, he was Professor of International and Comparative Social History at the Vrije Universiteit Amsterdam. Jan Lucassen is considered, together with Marcel van der Linden, as the founder of the Global Labour History approach, which advocates a worldwide perspective on the history of work and labour relations. Unlike classical labour history, Global Labour History does not focus solely on the male industrial worker in the North Atlantic region since the Industrial Revolution, but takes as its starting point the broadest possible definition of work, including domestic labour and various forms of forced labour. He is one of the principal instigators of IISH's Global Collaboratory on the History of Labour Relations, 1500–2000, in which a taxonomy of global labour relations was developed.

In 2021, he published The Story of Work: A New History of Humankind, a global history of work, from prehistoric times until the present, published by Yale University Press. The book gained positive reviews in The Economist., The Times, The Daily Telegraph, The Guardian, The New Statesman, and Financial Times. The Economist listed the book as one of the best books of 2021, while it was also mentioned as the best book of 2021 by British historian Simon Sebag Montefiore in the BBC History Magazine. In a January 2022 online public lecture and discussion at the London School of Economics, Patrick Wallis described the book 'a culmination of decades of scholarship that is turned into an incredibly engaging book that opens up [the history of work] to a wide readership'. Since its publication, six translations have been published, in Dutch, Korean, Portuguese, Japanese, Chinese and Polish, while among others a Spanish translation is in preparation. The author is also working on a graphic novel adaptation.

== Publications (selection) ==
- Jan Lucassen (ed.), Money of the Masses. Coin production and circulation in India (New Delhi, 2025) ISBN 9789360806675
- Hélder Carvalhal, Jan Lucassen, Judy Stephenson and Pim de Zwart, “Wage Systems and Inequalities in Global History”, International Review of Social History 70 (Special Issue 33, 2025) https://doi.org/10.1017/S0020859025000070
- Hélder Carvalhal and Jan Lucassen, "Beyond the Great Divergence: Household Income in the Indian Subcontinent, 1500-1870", International Review of Social History 70 (Special Issue 33, 2025), 135-159 https://doi.org/10.1017/S0020859025000100
- Jan Lucassen, The Story of Work: A New History of Humanity (New Haven, 2021) ISBN 978-0300256796; Dutch translation: De wereld aan het werk. Van de prehistorie tot nu (Zwolle, 2021) ISBN 978-9462584686; Korean translation: Jan Lucassen, 일의 역사 Ingan eun eotteoke nodongja ga doeeonna (Seoul, 2023) ISBN 9788991195639; Portuguese translation: Jan Lucassen, História do trabalho. Uma nova história da humanidade (Lisboa], 2023) ISBN 9789896447663; Polish translation: Jan Lucassen, Historia pracy. Nowe dzieje ludzkości (Kraków, 2023). ISBN 9788324088713; Japanese translation: Jan Lucassen, 仕事と人間 : 70万年のグローバル労働史 上 / Shigoto to ningen : nanajūmannen no gurōbaru rōdōshi 1 (Tokyo, 2024) ISBN 9784140819593; Chinese abridged and edited version: Jan Lucassen, 理解工作：一部人类劳动史 (Beijing 2024); South Asian edition with new preface: Jan Lucassen, The Story of Work: A New History of Humanity (New Delhi, 2025)
- Jan Lucassen, Leo Lucassen (Eds.), Globalizing Migration History: The Eurasian Experience 16th-21st centuries (Leiden and Boston, 2014) ISBN 978 9004271357
- Leo Lucassen en Jan Lucassen, Winnaars en verliezers. Een nuchtere balans van vijfhonderd jaar immigratie (Amsterdam, 2011, 2015) ISBN 978 9035136434; German translation: Gewinner und Verlierer. Fünf Jahrhunderte Immigration. Eine nüchterne Bilanz (Münster, 2014) ISBN 978 3830930624
- Jan Lucassen, Outlines of a History of Labour (Amsterdam: IISH Research Paper 2013)
- Jan Lucassen, Leo Lucassen, “From mobility transition to comparative global migration history”, in: Journal of Global History 6 (2011), pp. 299–307
- Jaap Kloosterman, Jan Lucassen, Rebels with a Cause: Five Centuries of Social History Collected by the IISH (Amsterdam, 2010) ISBN 978 9462984103
- Jan Lucassen, Leo Lucassen, Patrick Manning (eds), Migration History in World History: Multidisciplinary Approaches (Leiden and Boston, 2010) ISBN 978 9004205628
- Jan Lucassen, Leo Lucassen, “The mobility transition revisited, 1500-1900: what the case of Europe can offer to global history”, Journal of Global History 4 (2009), pp. 347–377
- Jan Lucassen, Tine De Moor, Jan Luiten van Zanden (Eds), “The Return of the Guilds”, International Review of Social History 53 (2008), Supplement 16
- Jan Lucassen (Ed.), Wages and Currency: Global Comparisons from Antiquity to the Twentieth Century (Bern 2007) ISBN 978 3039107827
- Albin Gladen, Antje Kraus, Piet Lourens, Jan Lucassen, Peter Schram, Helmut Talako, Gerda van Asselt (eds), Hollandgang im Spiegel der Reiseberichte evangelischer Geistlicher. Quellen zur saisonalen Arbeitswanderung in der zweiten Hälfte des 19. Jahrhunderts (Münster, 2007) ISBN 9783402068007
- Jan Lucassen, “The Brickmakers’ Strikes on the Ganges Canal in 1848-1849", in: International Review of Social History 51 (2006) Supplement 14, pp. 47–83
- Jan Lucassen (ed.), Global Labour History: A State of the Art (Bern, 2006, 2008) ISBN 9783039115761
- Maarten Prak, Catharina Lis, Jan Lucassen, Hugo Soly (eds.), Craft Guilds in the Early Modern Low Countries: Work, Power and Representation (Aldershot etc., 2006) ISBN 9781138379114
- Jan Lucassen (co-editor with Leo Lucassen), Migration, Migration History, History: Old Paradigms and New Perspectives (Bern, 1997, 1999, 2005) ISBN 9783039108640
- Piet Lourens, Jan Lucassen, Arbeitswanderung und berufliche Spezialisierung. Die lippischen Ziegler im 18. und 19. Jahrhundert (Osnabrück, 1999)
- Marcel van der Linden, Jan Lucassen, Prolegomena for a Global Labour History (Amsterdam, 1999)
- Jan Lucassen, Rinus Penninx, Newcomers. Immigrants and their Descendants in the Netherlands 1550-1995 (Amsterdam, 1997)
- P. van Royen, J.R. Bruijn, J. Lucassen (Eds), "Those Emblems of Hell"? European Sailors and the Maritime labour Market, 1570-1870 (St. John's, 1997) ISBN 9780968128831
- K. Davids, J. Lucassen (Eds.), A Miracle Mirrored: The Dutch Republic in European Perspective (Cambridge, 1995) ISBN 9780521158275
