= Willem Leyel =

c. 1593 – 1654 Danish captain and governor of Danish India

4th Governor of Tranquebar
- In office 1643–1648 Co-leading with Anders Nielsen (acting)
- Monarch: Christian IV
- Preceded by: Bernt Pessart
- Succeeded by: Poul Hansen Korsør

Personal details
- Born: c. 1593 Elsinore, Denmark–Norway
- Died: 1654 Copenhagen, Denmark–Norway
- Spouse(s): Alhed Lübbers (m. c. 1624)
- Children: Christina Leyel; Hans; Anders
- Parent(s): Johan Willumsen; Ingeborg Frederiksdatter Leyel

Military service
- Allegiance: Dutch Republic c. 1623; Denmark–Norway 1626–1648
- Rank: Captain
- Battles/wars: Conflict between Willem Leyel and Bernt Pessart; Willem Leyel's siege of Dansborg; Siege of Dansborg (1644); Dano-Mughal War; Capture of St. Michael

Willem Leyel (Note: Danish: [vilɛm lɑy:əl]) (alternative spellings include Willum and Wilhelm; c. 1593 – Spring 1654) was a Danish governor of Tranquebar and captain in the Royal Dano-Norwegian Navy.

Willem Leyel was born in c. 1593 in Elsinore and would be employed by the V.O.C. in Batavia during his early 20s. During his employment, Leyel lived in Persia, where he was acknowledged for his hard work.

In 1639, Leyel was appointed as head of Christianshavn and was to inspect the financial conditions caused by Governor Bernt Pessart in India. However, in early 1640, during her voyage, Christianshavn was detained at Tenerife, and Leyel subsequently spent the next three years negotiating with Spanish officials for her release. A deal was finalized in March 1643, and Leyel would reach Danish-owned Tranquebar in September of the same year.

Regardless, Leyel was to use military force to become the governor of Tranquebar, succeeding Dutchman Bernt Pessart. During his governorship, Leyel improved and stabilized the Company's trade and local relations. Despite this, discontent from the other Danish officers led to a mutiny against him in 1648. Leyel would be arrested and sent to Copenhagen, where he would die, possibly from the plague, in 1654.

== Early life ==
Willem Leyel was born in Elsinore (Helsingør) around 1593 to the highly respected Leyel family. The Leyel family migrated from Scotland to Elsinore in the 16th century, and Willem Leyel liked to mention his family's origins.

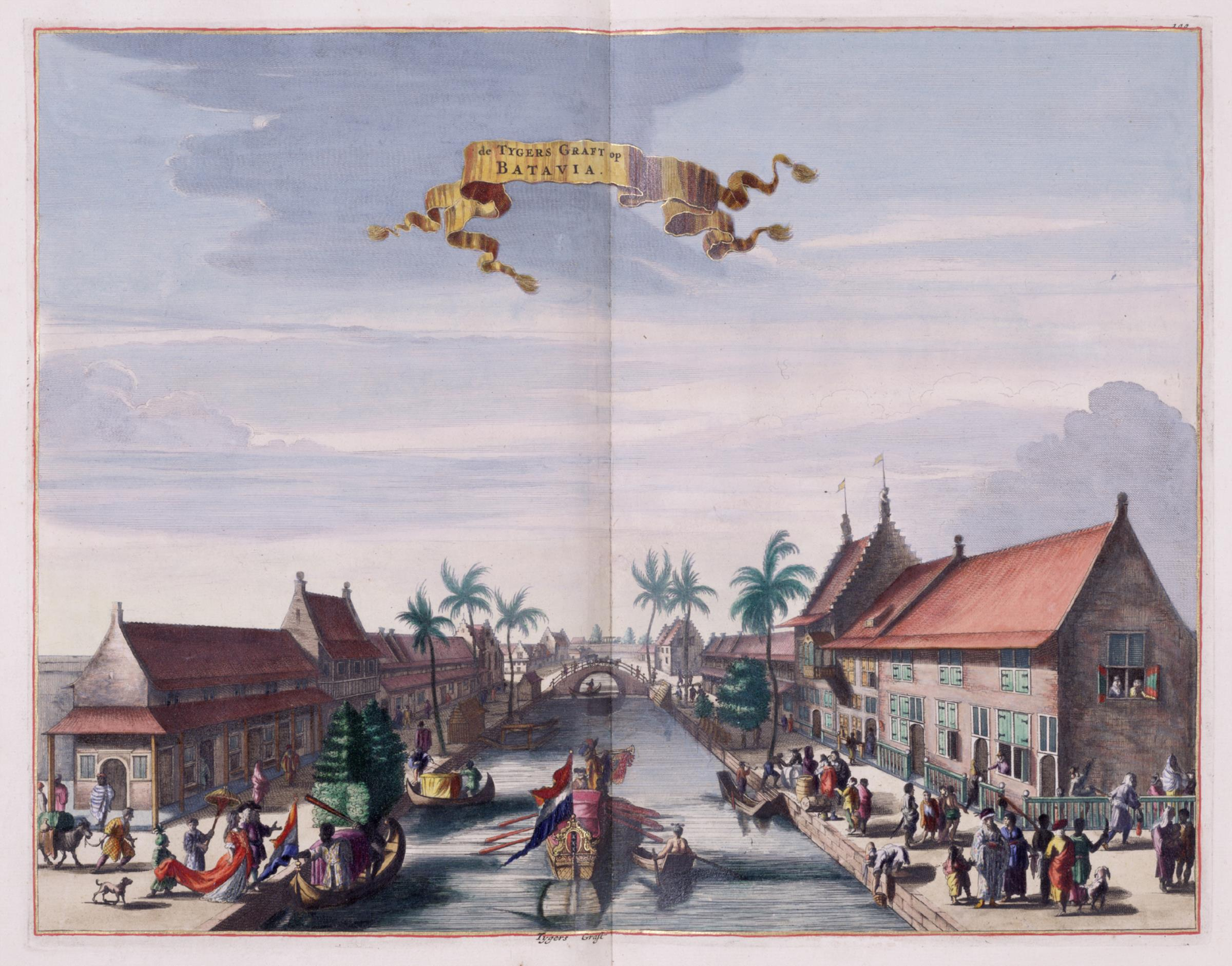
View of Batavia taken from the Atlas van der Hagen, Koninklijke Bibliotheek. Leyel served in Batavia, which was one of the biggest European trading posts in Asia.

=== In service of the Dutch East India Company ===
The first time we have reliable information about Willem Leyel, he was employed by the Dutch East India Company in Batavia. Louis de Dieu in his Historia Christi mentions Leyel briefly:

I owe it to the Danish merchant Willem Leyel to confess that the information that this man, raised above the ordinary spirit of commerce, though no scholar, while he still lived in Persia, learned to speak, read, and write the Persian language, passed on to me, when he spent some time in Leyden, has been very useful

— Louis de Dieu, Historia Christi

If it is true that Leyel spent time in Persia, he may have arrived in 1623 when the first Dutch commercial expedition arrived in Persia and succeeded in establishing a trading post. However, Leyel could not have been there for long, since in 1626, we find him, together with his comrade, Claus Rytter, at Pipili, where the Danes had made attempts to make a foothold.

== In Denmark ==
Leyel appears to have returned to Denmark in the middle of the Danish intervention in the Thirty Years' War, and on 1 May 1628, he was appointed captain in the Royal Danish Navy. Sources remained silent about Leyel for the next couple of years; however, in 1634 Leyel is found having a conversation with Albret Skeel about the Company's finances. The Company was in a dire situation and needed an experienced man like Leyel to sort things out. Subsequently, Leyel was sent to India with the Christianshavn in 1639.

== Voyage of Christianshavn ==
Upon leaving Copenhagen, they sailed north towards Elsinore waiting there for ten days for the weather to improve. Thereafter they went to Varberg, and then, after a heavy storm, they reached Plymouth. After a couple of weeks, they continued south reaching Tenerife in early 1640. However, at Santa Cruz, the ship and captain were inspected by the Spanish, who were skeptical of other European nations trading and colonizing India.

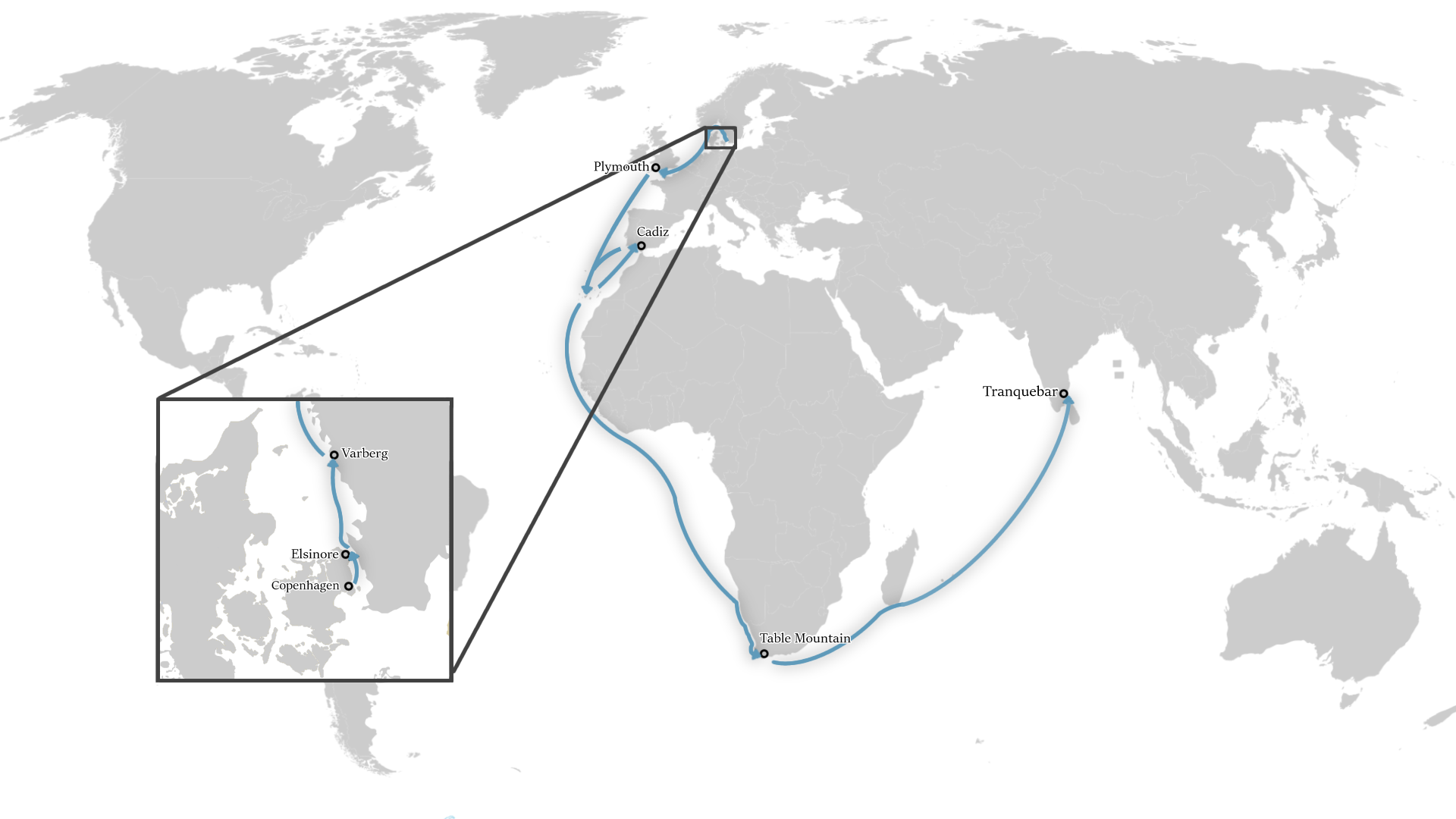
Voyage of the Christianshavn from 1639 to 1643. Notably, Leyel's trip to Madrid is not included.

=== Obstacles with the Spanish ===
First, the Spaniards demanded that the captain come ashore; however, after a couple of hours they also demanded Leyel himself to come ashore. Leyel rejected this for the reason that it was getting too late and that he would rather wait until the night was over. However, to reduce the delay of his arrival in Tranquebar, Leyel initiated an escape plan. Leyel theorized that he and his men must attempt to escape as soon as the darkness hits, otherwise they might be delayed indefinitely. Notwithstanding Leyel's efforts, the Spanish would intercept his escape, and Leyel was forced to surrender.

Leyel and his men were thereafter sent to La Laguna, where they would be imprisoned. Leyel and the local governor, Don Luis Fernandez de Cordoba, exchanged intense conversations and meetings over the next couple of days, yet de Cordoba hesitated to trust Leyel. In the end, de Cordoba mockingly suggested that if Leyel was to complain, he was free to go to Madrid, which Leyel, after consideration gave in on. On 16 March, three Danes, including Leyel, left Santa Cruz for Madrid over the privateer-marred ocean. Arriving at Madrid, Leyel issued a complaint about the treatment he and his men had received and demanded that Christianshavn be released on behalf of the Danish king. Because of the Spanish bureaucracy, Leyel waited for his complaint to be attended to for months.

Much to Leyel's fortune, Christian IV's son-in-law, Hannibal Sehested, had arrived in Spain to negotiate an alliance treaty with King Philip IV, and Leyel saw this as a chance to get his complaint attended to. After much effort, Leyel's complaint reached Spanish officials, and after heavy negotiation, Christianshavn could finally be released. Subsequently, after three years, a relieved Leyel could once again set sail for Tranquebar. After reaching Cape Verde, Table Mountain and possibly also Madagascar, Leyel was finally within reach of Tranquebar.

Voyages

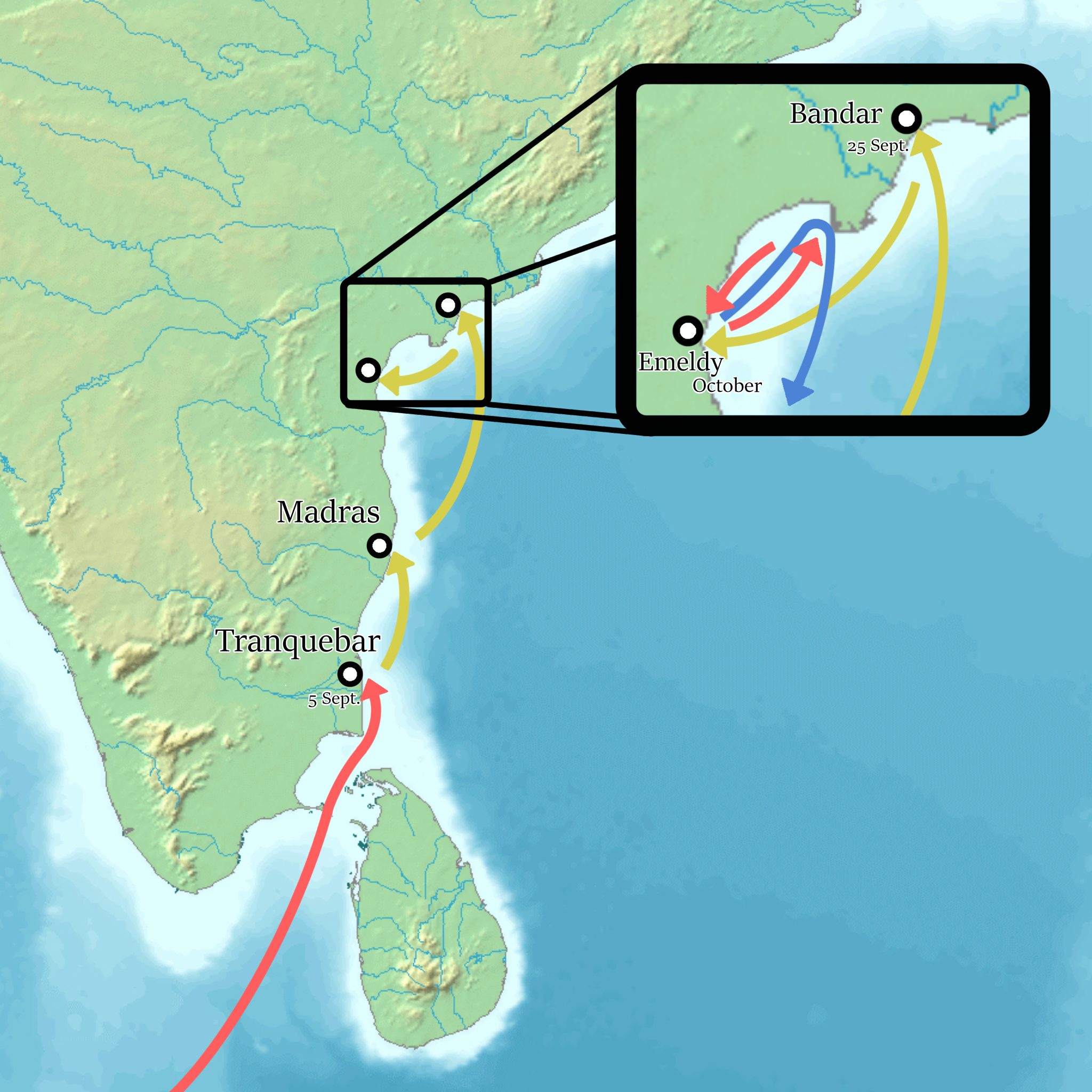
September–October, 1643

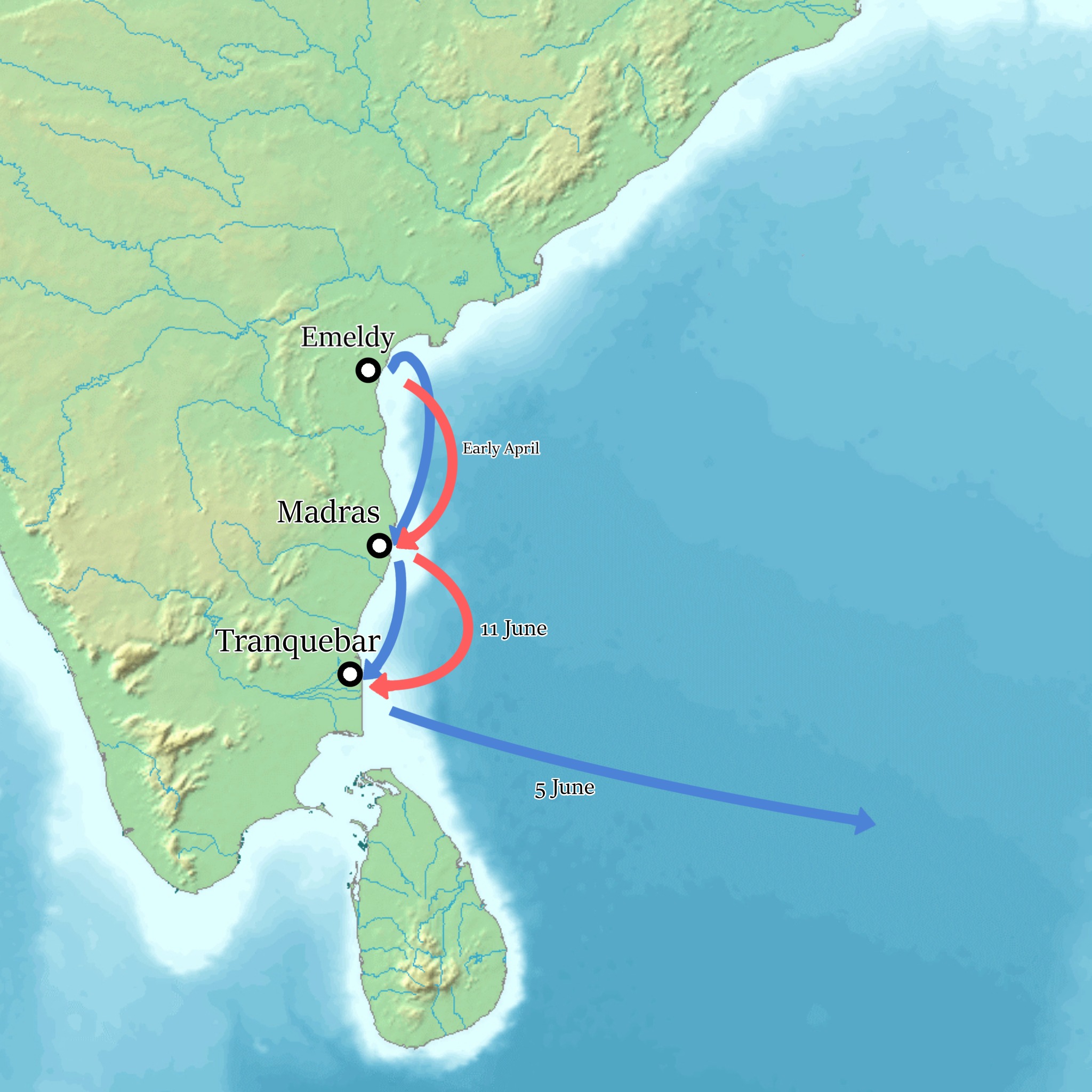
April–June, 1644
Routes of Willem Leyel
Routes of Bernt Pessart
Joint routes

== Arrival at Tranquebar ==
On 5 September 1643, Leyel arrived at Fort Dansborg and started investigating the conditions. Leyel noticed heavy damage to the Dansborg fortress and found the warehouse completely empty. Pessart explained this by claiming that Danborg was no longer of much use and that the warehouse was emptied to load two ships. When the bad conditions became evident for Leyel, Pessart opted to leave Tranquebar for Madras; however, because of Leyel's distrust of Pessart, Leyel followed suit. After reaching Madras, they sailed to Masulipatnam, and after that, Emeldy. At Emeldy, Leyel attempted to arrest Pessart and his men, yet when Leyel reached Pessart's tent, Pessart had already fled. As a response, Leyel immediately sent out Jørgen Hansen with a longboat and a strongly armed crew to catch Pessart. Hansen's pursuit proved unsuccessful, and Pessart could with ease reach Tranquebar in safety.

At Tranquebar, Pessart had taken everything he could, bought a little Portuguese sloop at Carical, and sailed for Japan on 5 June 1644. Six days later, on 11 June, Leyel and his men reached the coast of Tranquebar but found the place completely lifeless.

=== Siege of Tranquebar ===
After sending multiple letters from his ship to Dansborg, Leyel finally got an answer. However, in the letter, the officers at Dansborg rejected the removal of Pessart as governor, and Leyel was thus compelled to take control of the fortress by force. With 70 black and white men, Leyel went ashore and besieged the fortress with the help of the local population and the Thanjavurian Nayak. After a shortage in Dansborg, the besieged Pessart Loyalists emerged from the fortress and surrendered. The surrendered officers thereafter promised to be Loyal to Leyel and decided the recognize him as their rightful governor.

== Regime ==
Inside Tranquebar, Leyel found everything in bad shape, and Pessart even seemed to have taken the Company's ledgers with him. Leyel now had to form a picture of Pessart's trade, which appears to have been minimized to only operating in Bantam and Makassar. Additionally, the garrison and citizens of Tranquebar were lazy and addicted to drinking.

Danish East India
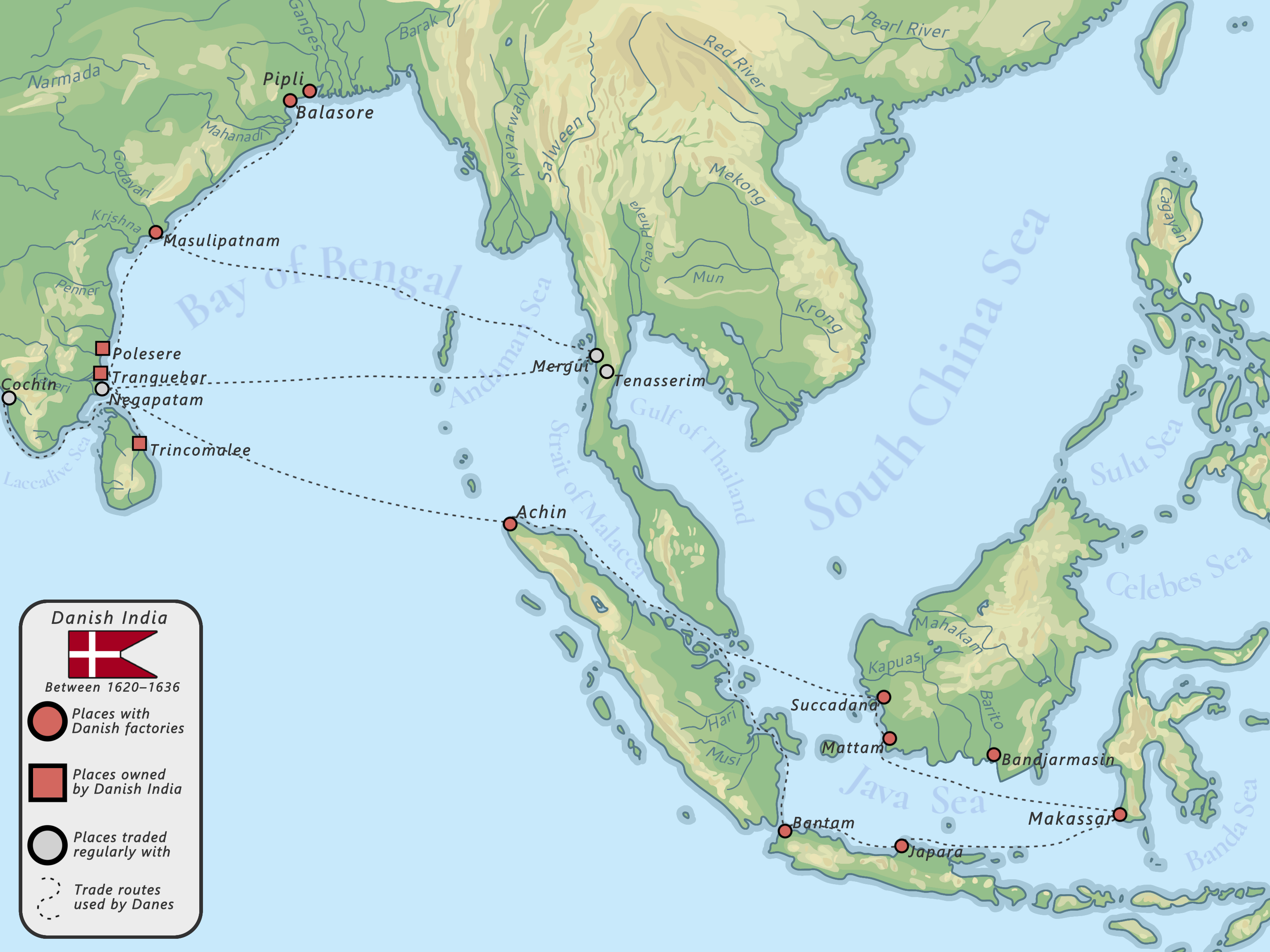
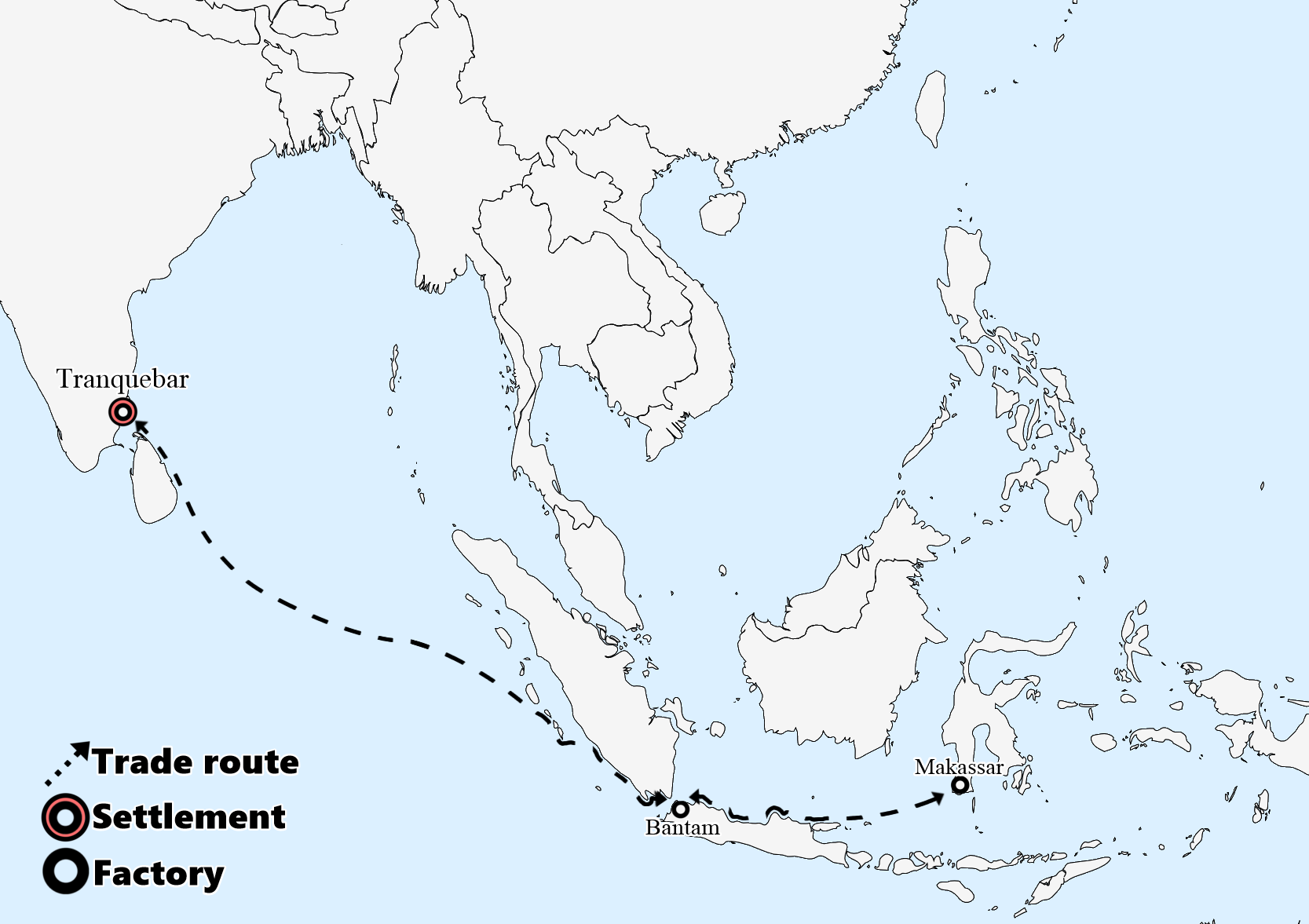
Top: Danish settlements, factories, and trade routes during most of Pessart's administration.
Bottom: Danish settlements, factories, and trade routes during the end of Pessart's administration and afterward.

On 28 June 1643, Leyel summoned the council to read out the orders from Christian IV and to get an overview of Pessart's debts. The council concluded that Pessart was said to owe 90–100.000 Danish rigsdaler to Persian and Moorish merchants in Masulipatnam and that Pessart was to be arrested wherever he could be found. Leyel quickly orchestrated the rebuilding of Dansborg and parts of Tranquebar. Indian bricklayers and carpenters were set to rebuild the walls and repair the woodwork of Dansborg, and after time, many of the houses were torn down and rebuilt. On 4 September, Leyel appointed Anders Nielsen as acting governor of Tranquebar whenever Leyel could not be present himself.

Leyel also came into problems with two clergymen, who had continuously caused havoc in Tranquebar. Pastor Niels Andersen was put in prison, attested in court, and sentenced to exile in Ceylon, while Pastor Christian Storm was executed based on his crimes.

=== Isolation from Denmark ===
In 1643, the Swedes marched across Jutland under Lennart Torstensson, occupying large parts of the country. The Danes were caught off guard, and Christian IV had to sign an ignominious peace in the summer of 1645. The news of this slowly reached India, and it gradually became evident to Leyel that neither the King nor the Company had any means to send new ships to the East.

Leyel's original plan was to send the Christianshavn home immediately with a good cargo. However, there was a danger of the ship being seized by the Swedes as long as the two nations were still waging war. Furthermore, the lack of ships from Denmark also resulted in a lack of men, which became highly evident 20 years after Leyel's departure, when Governor Eskild Andersen Kongsbakke would be the only Dane left in Tranquebar. Yet, still, during Leyel's regime, there was an increasing lack of men. In 1644, Leyel reported that there were only 17 white men at Dansborg, and of these, at least 10 were from other European nations. As such, Leyel found a great need for lascar, which would serve the Company.

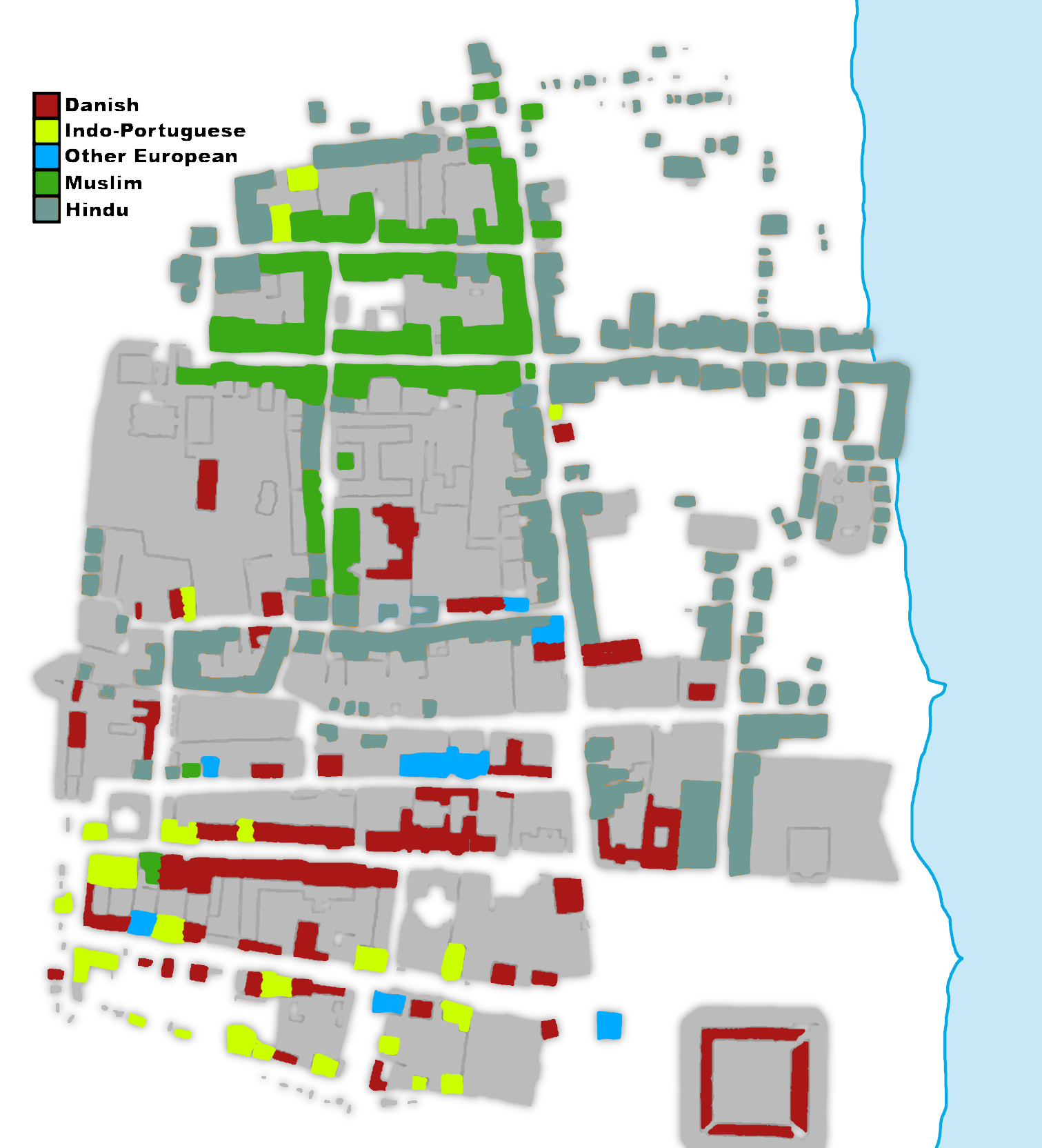
Map showing the distribution of Europeans, Muslims, and Hindus in Tranquebar, 1790. Tranquebar was mainly an Indian and Hundi city, with a small but powerful European elite.

Additionally, there were not many ships. Originally, Christianshavn and the sloops Fortuna and Valby constituted the whole fleet, however, prizes from the Bengalis would supplement this.

=== Tranquebar ===
During Leyel's administration, the Dutch advanced all over the region, and subsequently, many fleeing Portuguese sought refuge in Tranquebar. Leyel promised the Portuguese refugees security of life, and some of them were employed by the Company as soldiers and minor officials, while others took part in the regional trade.

The Danes allowed complete freedom of conscience. Leyel naturally let the Hindus keep their temples and the Muslims their mosques, but also gave the Portuguese permission to erect a large Catholic church, which Leyel claimed would be as big as Holmen Church in Copenhagen. Some of the Portuguese refugees also joined the local Lutheran congregation, because of the efforts of the later exiled Niels Andersen.

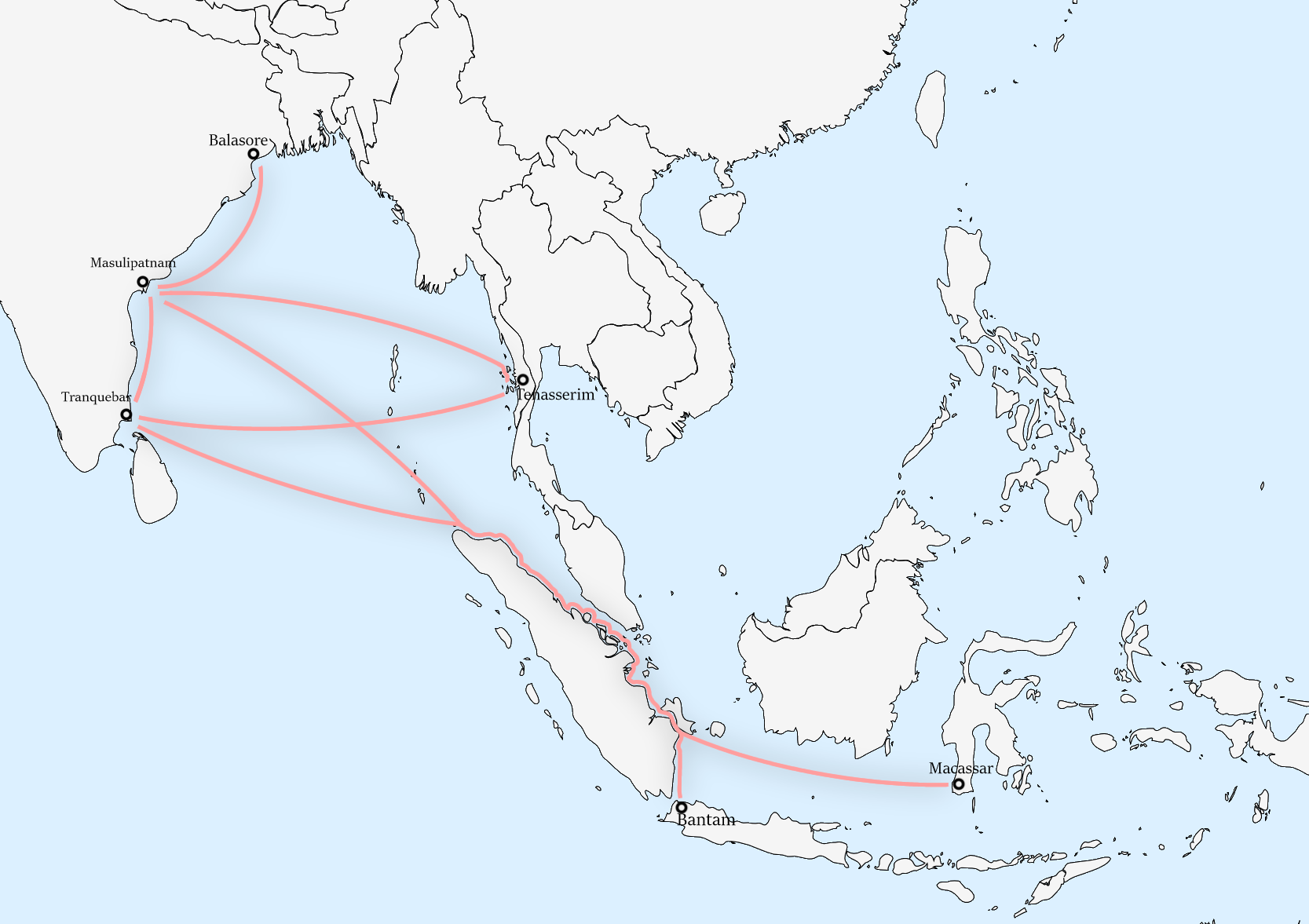
Trade routes of the first Danish East India Company. Most of these were out of use by Pessart, Leyel, and their immediate successors. However, they were gradually reused in the 1670s.

=== Trade ===
Because of Pessart's unorthodox commercial strategy and exponential debts, trade with Ceylon, Masulipatnam and Makassar was in total disorder. Leyel nonetheless still found Makassar to be the best place for trade on the Sunda Islands, and he hoped to pay off Pessart's debts there. According to K.H. Wirta from Leiden University, the Danish Company had three regular trade networks: The first was with Ceylon and consisted of arrack, cinnamon and elephants, all of which were key products. The second trade network was with Makassar and consisted especially of cloves. The third network spanded over the north of the Coromandel Coast and continued along Bengal. Here Leyel obtained quick profits by slavery and privateering voyages against the Bengalis.

At Bantam, Herman Clausen had built up and organized the Danish trading station, however, he became seriously ill and was transported by the Dutch to Tranquebar where he would soon after die. The most important trading ports for the Danes were Porto Novo, Cuddalore, Pondicherry, and Pulicat, moreover, the various trading hubs on the Sunda Islands, Bengal, and Ceylon were also of importance to the Danes.

A few days after Clausen's death, Leyel sailed with the Fortuna to Emeldy to spend the winter there. Masulipatnam was still closed to the Danes until they could pay their debts.

=== Privateering war against the Bengalis ===
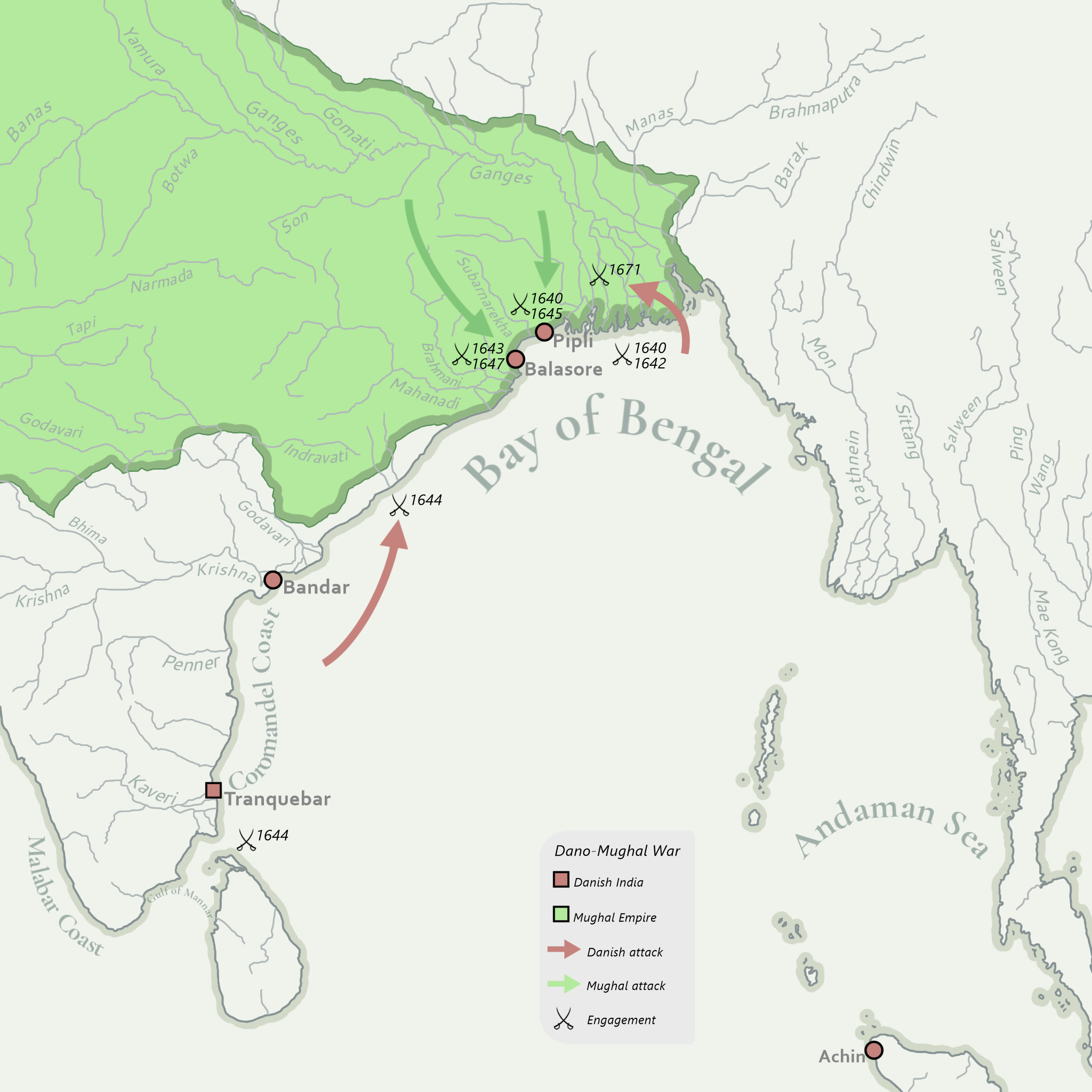
Campaigns of the Dano-Mughal War at the time of Willem Leyel

Leyel intended to continue Pessart's privateering war against the Bengalis, which had started as a result of the major ship losses off the Bengali coast. This was by far the best way to obtain money for the Company, and the risks were of minimal importance. Examples include the Christianshavn’s seizure of a Bengali ship near Narsapur in December 1643, a capture of a small ship coming from Pipli in 1644, and a hijacking of a much larger ship coming from the Maldives the same year. Warfare against the Bengalis continued to be conducted, however, the Bengalis were not the only enemy of the Danes. In December 1644, an Indian general from Thanjavur had started to besiege Dansborg, though being unsuccessful in conquering Tranquebar. Contrary, relations with other Indian kingdoms remained positive. In 1644, the acting governor of Tranquebar, Anders Nielsen, was sent to Ceylon with gifts to the local ruler, and the king of Makassar still viewed the Danes favourably. Additionally, Nielsen was sent to the Nayak of Thanjavur with a palanquin as a gift, and after prolonged negotiations, the Nayak accepted the gift and agreed to pay for the damages done to Tranquebar by the Indian general.

In March 1645, Leyel sent the Christianshavn with a crew of six Europeans to Pipli, however, it never returned. A loss of six Europeans was a significant loss to the Company, and Leyel continuously asked the directors in Copenhagen for more men. He went further and explained how he could not have managed the colonies if he had not been able to hire Englishmen and Dutchmen.

=== Relations with other Europeans ===
Leyel maintained excellent relations with both the English and Portuguese. Leyel seems to be on familiar terms with the English captains and men from the trading stations round about the East Indies, and he had a friendly relationship with the Portuguese viceroy, Filipe Mascarenhas, who gave the Danes the freedom to trade at all Portuguese stations in India. On the other hand, the Dutch were hostile to the Danes and sought to oust them from Tranquebar. Evidently, the Dutch had supported the Thanjavurians in their siege on Dansborg in 1644 and had tried bribing the local Nayak to give them Tranquebar the same year, however, without success. The threat of the growing influence of the Dutch made Leyel suspect that they would "completely crush and destroy us".

=== Negotiations with the Bengalis and renewed warfare ===
Leyel tried to cause as much harm as possible to the Bengalis, which was highly succeeded. In 1645, the privateering war had harmed the Bengal interests so much that they sent a Jesuit, Antonio Rodríguez, to Leyel to reach a settlement. Leyel was requested to estimate the combined Danish losses through Bengali injustices, however, they could not reach an agreement, and fighting intensified instead.

Later, the Dane, Jørgen Hansen, went to Balasore to conclude peace with the Bengalis. However, Hansen felt that the governor was not interested, and he instead abandoned the talks and sailed off on a new privateering voyage. The Danes captured two ships in late January 1647. Another large sloop was later seized, and after that, an additional couple of smaller vessels were seized. At once, Leyel also felt obliged to declare war on the Sultanate of Golconda, and after the seizure of a couple of ships, the two parties agreed to a peace settlement.

=== Rebellion ===
The peace settlement with Golconda effectively put an end lucrative privateering market, which the Danish seamen and officers had been heavily involved in. This may have been the main factor of a rebellion in Tranquebar against Leyel's governorship in 1648. Nevertheless, upon arriving at Tranquebar after a voyage, Leyel was arrested and sent to Copenhagen on a Dutch vessel.

Leyel must have felt deeply betrayed by his own men, and it was a terrible blow for him.

== Later years ==
Despite his arrest and departure for Copenhagen, Leyel quickly focused on clearing his name and the accusations that caused his arrest. Leyel was duly changed once he arrived in the Danish capital, however, the case seems to have been quickly abandoned. Despite the accusations, the new king, Frederick III, listened to his narrative, welcomed him in 1654, and recognized his service in India:

It is Our gracious will and pleasure that Our steward shall give Our well-beloved Willem Leyel in view of his humble petition from Our victualling store belonging to Our Castle in Copenhagen annually until We decide otherwise, to be reckoned from the last St Philip’s and St James’ day the following victuals, that is rye 3 pounds, barley 4 pounds, butter 1 cask, beef two casks, pork 320 pounds, herrings 1 cask, cod 1 cask, oatmeal 1 cask, peas 1 cask, dried cod 1,320 pounds. From Our Castle in Copenhagen

— Frederik III of Denmark, Haffniæ 22, Februari anno 1654

From this, Frederik must have viewed Leyel without any suspicion of fraud or swindling against the Company, however, this reward was far from what Leyel had hoped for. Leyel had probably hoped for a coat of arms and greater recognition such as his predecessor, Roland Crappé, had obtained, yet he had to be grateful for the supply of rations so that he could sustain his life.

A month later of Leyel's arrival, the bubonic plague swept across Copenhagen, killing 8.000 people during the summer of 1654. It is uncertain if it was the plague that put an end to Leyel's life, however, at any rate, he died in 1654.

== Personal interests ==
Of special interest, Leyel seems to have carried a list of books from many different languages. A sample of his includes:

Danish books:

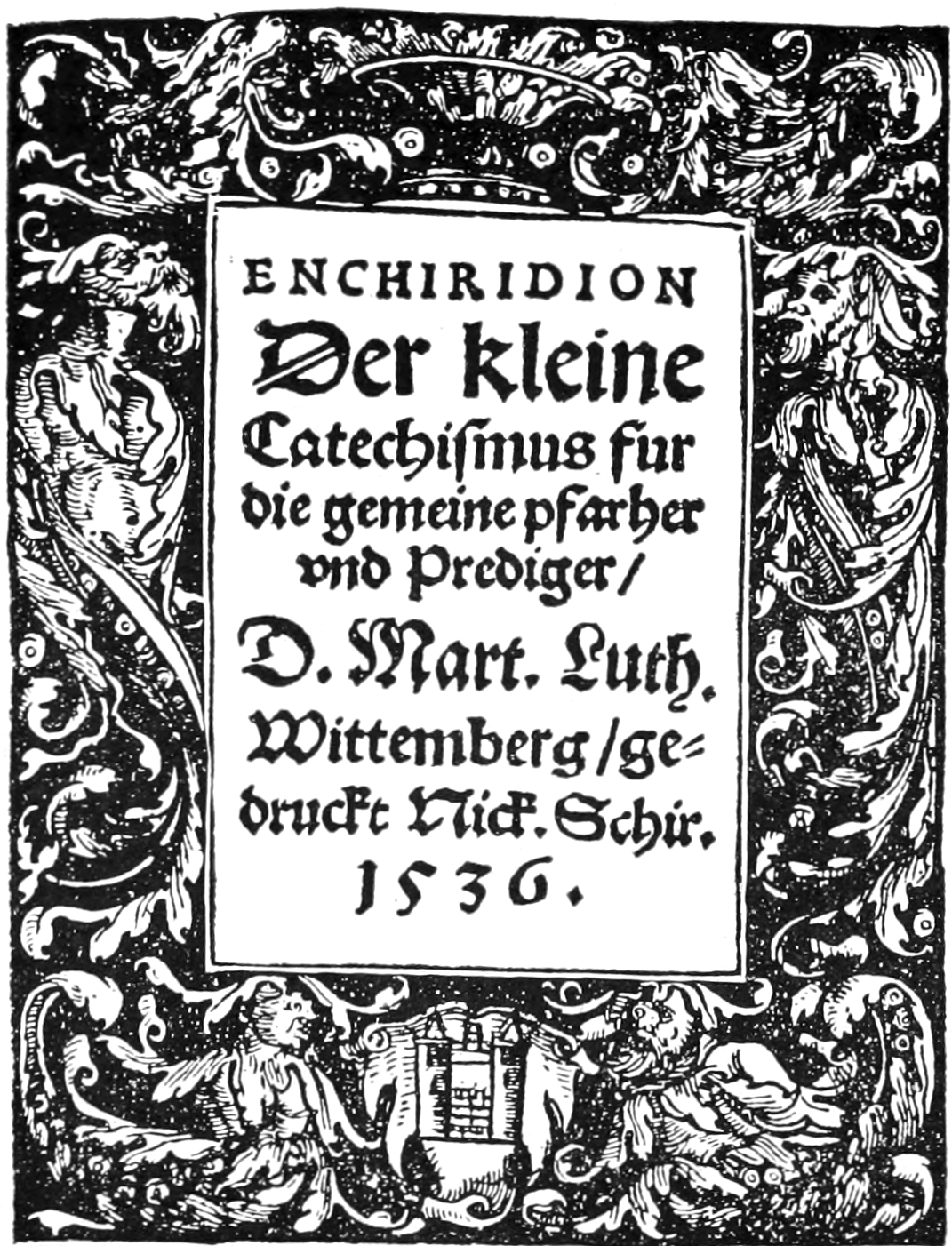
Title page of Luther's Small Catechism Wittenberg edition, 1536. A book Leyel carried around in India.

- Luther's Catechism
- Jyske Lov
- Danmarks Riges Mønt
- Niels Michelsen's Medical Guide

Low Saxon books:

- 1 Gospel
- Augsburg Confession
- Herbarium in folio

English books:

- Purchas his Pilgrimes

Dutch books:

- Plinius the Younger
- Historie Justinie
- Ovid's Metamorphoses

Others:

- A Malay and Portuguese dictionary compiled by Herman Clausen
- 6 Moorish books
- Persian books

The collection can indicate Leyel's large familiarity with languages. Apart from Danish, Leyel seems to be able to speak Latin, German, Dutch, Spanish, Portuguese, Persian and possibly also Arabic and English. Judging from his multilingualism, Leyel probably also knew something of the local Tamil language, present in the area.

== Family Tree ==
Kirstine Jensdatter | Frederik Leyel | Anne Bosisdatter | Willum Diderichsen
Ingeborg Leyel | Hans Willumsen
Alhed Lübbers | Willem Leyel | Anne Leyel | Kirstine Leyel
Christina Leyel | Hans Leyel | Anders Leyel

== See also ==
- Roland Crappé – 17th-century Dutch general and governor of Danish India
- Peter Anker
- Johannes Rehling – Danish colonial administrator
- Wolf Henrik von Kalnein – 17th-century Danish officer and governor of Danish India
- Eskild Andersen Kongsbakke – c. 1620 – 1674 Danish commander and Governor of Danish India

== Works cited ==
- Bredsdorff, Asta (2009). The Trials and Travels of Willem Leyel. Copenhagen: Museum Tusculanum Press. ISBN 9788763530231.
- Haellquist, Karl Reinhold (21 August 2013). Asian Trade Routes. Routledge. ISBN 978-1-136-10082-6.
- Rindom, Jan (1995). Ostindisk Kompagni 1616-50 [East Indian Company 1616-50] (PDF) (in Danish). Copenhagen: Det Kongelige Bibliotek.
- Sethuraman, N. (2016). The Danish East India Company From Establishment To The Epilogue (1616 – 1729) - A Historical Perspective. Salem: Tamil Nadu History Congress Proceedings.
- Wellen, Kathryn (2015). The Danish East India Company's War against the Mughal Empire, 1642-1698 (PDF). Royal Netherlands Institute for Southeast Asian and Caribbean Studies.
- Wirta, K.H. (2018). Dark horses of business : overseas entrepreneurship in seventeenthcentury Nordic trade in the Indian and Atlantic oceans. Universiteit Leiden.
