= Nakhuda =

Captain of a pearling boat

A Nakhuda was the captain of a pearling boat sailing in the Persian Gulf, typically from Kuwait, Bahrain, Qatar and the United Arab Emirates (then the Trucial States).

Arabian Pearling vessels would typically take to sea with the Nakhuda, assistant ("Mijadimi"), a singer ("Nahham"), some eight divers ("Ghais"), and ten haulers ("Saib"). The cook on the vessel was titled the "Jallas". Larger boats would even include a Muttawa to lead prayers.

The vessels ranged from the relatively small Banoosh to the 100-foot Jalboot, a corruption of the English term jollyboat. The trade was lucrative - at the turn of the 19th century, revenues from the Gulf pearl trade were estimated at some £1,434,000, with an additional £30,439 of this earned from mother-of-pearl.

In the early 20th century, Lorimer recorded 1200 boats involved in the trade across the Trucial States, each carrying an average crew of 18.

== Role ==
The Nakhuda was responsible for selecting dive locations and for selling the catch, but the date of sailing to the oyster banks and the duration of the voyage would be set by the admiral of each port's pearling fleet. This official would be appointed by the Ruler. The actual work of pearling was dangerous and exhausting - divers would make up to 60 dives a day. The accumulated catch would be piled up and then in the early morning of the following day, the Nakhuda would be responsible for overseeing the opening of the oysters, weighing and registering the catch of small pearls and selecting particularly fine pearls for individual sale.

One Nakhuda was assigned as the leader of the port's fleet for the 120-day season from June–September (this, longer season would often be preceded by a shorter, 40-day season known as 'the cold dive' as the Spring Gulf waters would be cool at the time) and would take responsibility for coordinating efforts to help any boat in distress. He would also lead the return voyage.

== Trade ==
Visiting the pearl banks during the season, the pearl dealers ("tawwash"), would buy the bulk catch from the Nakhuda, sorting the pearls using grading pans. Nakhudas would seek individual sales for larger or outstanding pearls, taking them to a pearl trader, or Tajir. Typically, Nakhudas financed their voyages, although some were financed by merchants and obligated to yield their catch in return for a share in proceeds.

== See also ==
- Nakhoda Mosque
- Nakhoda Manis
- Nakhoda Ragam
