= Dano-Mughal War =

Danish colonial conflict against the Mughal Empire

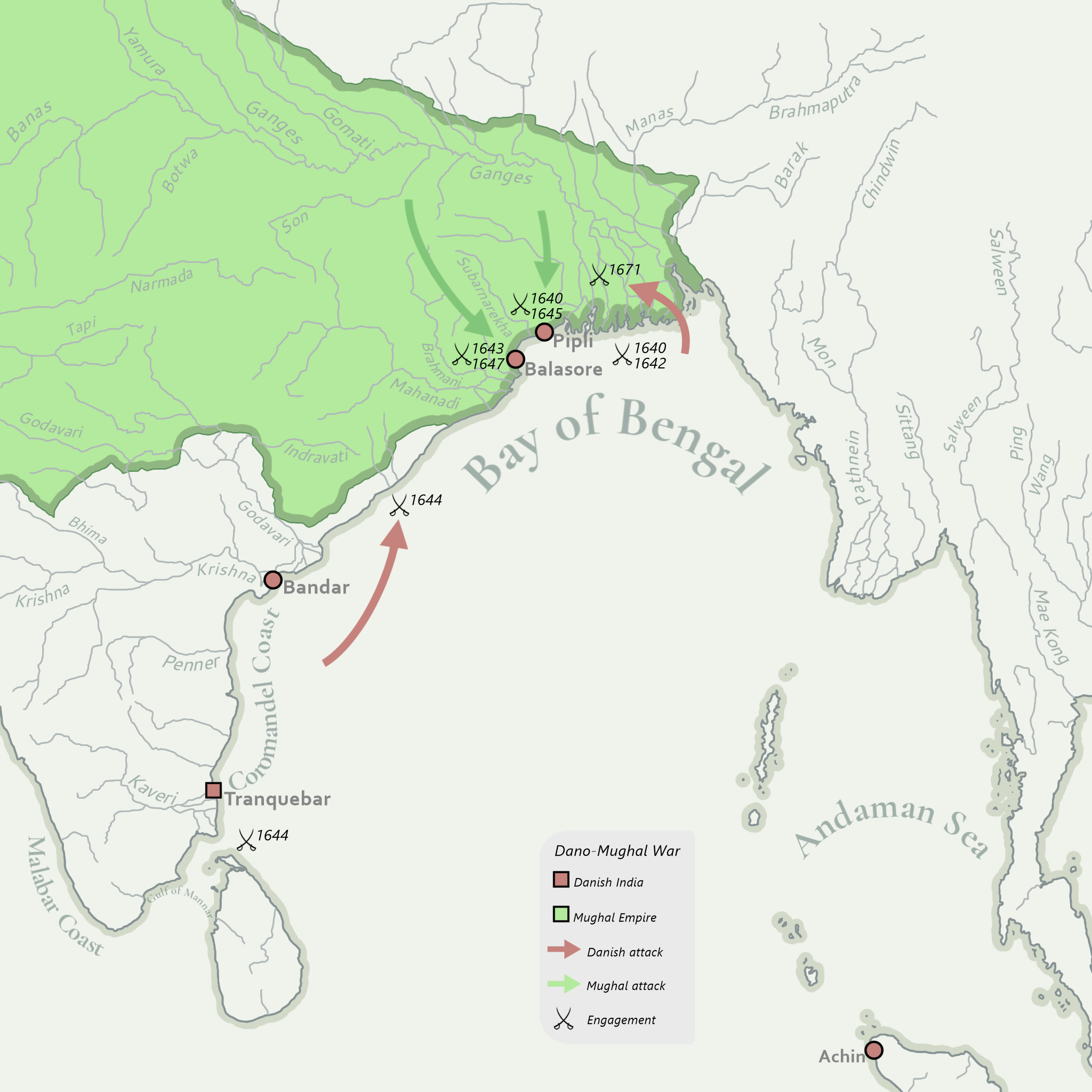
- Campaign map of the Dano-Mughal War
Date	1642–1698
Location	Bay of Bengal; India
Result	Stalemate (See peace)
Territorial changes	Dannemarksnagore is leased to Danish India

Belligerents
Denmark–Norway; Danish India	Mughal Empire; Bengal Subah; Dutch East India Company

Commanders and leaders
(Denmark–Norway) Christian IV # (Denmark–Norway) Christian V (Danish India) von Kalnein (Danish India) Poul Nielsen # (Danish India) Willem Leyel # (Danish India) Bernt Pessart (Danish India) Claus Rytter # (Danish India) Carsten Ludvigsen #	Shah Jahan # Aurangzeb; Mirza Mumin # Mohammed Ajumadi; Malik Kasim; Abdul Gany (POW); Merse Meliquebek

Strength
5 ships (1647–1648)	Unknown

Casualties and losses
30 ships	30 ships

The Dano-Mughal War, formally the Danish East India Company's War against the Mughal Empire, was a colonial and maritime conflict between the Mughal Empire and the Danish East India Company over trade commerce in the Bay of Bengal. Lasting from 1642 to 1698, the conflict has also been referred to by historians as the Dano-Bengali Thirty Years' War.

== Background ==
Monarchs

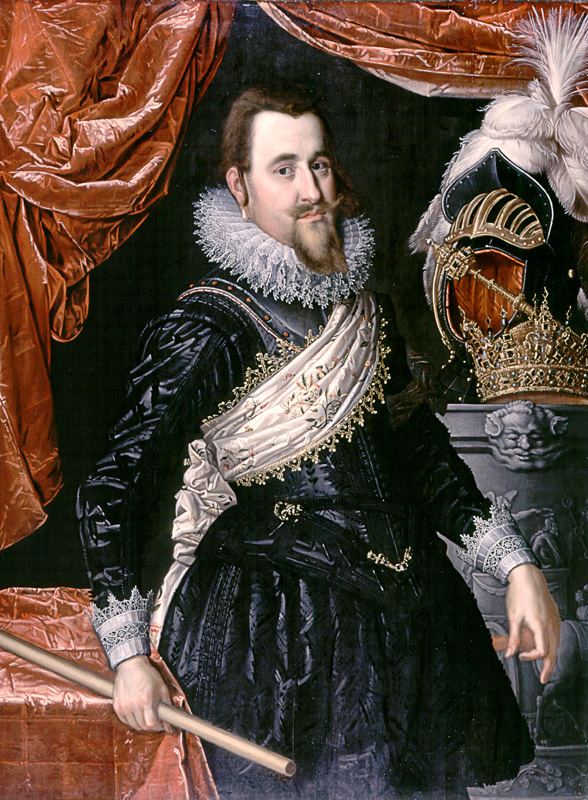
Christian IV, King of Denmark and Norway and more... (r.1588–1648)

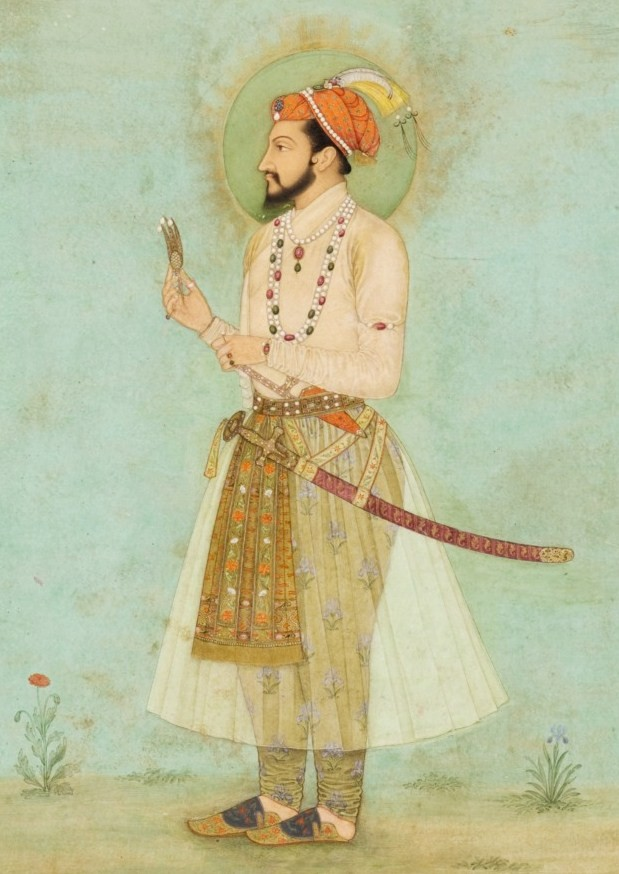
Shah Jahan I, Emperor of the Mughals (r.1628–1658)

At the start of the 17th century European colonialism started to expand. Christian IV, an ambitious king who wanted to show off Denmark–Norway on the international stage, sought to increase Denmark-Norway's sphere of influence and its financial and economic independence, so he founded the first Danish East India Company in 1616. Nevertheless, he stimulated the establishment of trading companies for Greenland, Iceland, and the West and East Indies. The company was initially weak. It had had a rough First expedition and wanted to expand its Mercantilism.

== Declaration of war ==
In 1642 the Danish East India Company declared war on the Mughal Empire. This may sound unreasonable, by comparing the two nations. The Mughals were a vast Asiatic Empire, while Denmark–Norway was a declining power. For instance, the Mughal Empire's army was perhaps fifty times larger than Denmark's entire population.

The reason why the Danish East India Company declared war on the Mughal Empire lay in the nature of European Maritime trade. Violence was used to ensure the safe transport of goods and was key to the success of commercial enterprise in medieval Europe. Another mean, mercantilism, the dominant economic theory in sixteenth and seventeenth-century Europe was also contributing to the competition and conflict in the area. It associated states' strength with their economic dominance. It also emphasized commercial competition. Such competition was used by various European Charter companies like the Danish East India Company.

In 1640, On a voyage from Makassar to Masulipatnam, the St. Jacob was seized and wrecked by Bengali local authorities, the Danes could not negotiate the release of the cargo. Dutch records claim that the St. Jacob's cargo was seized because of Danish debts, but the Danes viewed the seizure as a tyrannous act and in 1642 made a formal declaration of war.

== 1642–1648 ==
=== War at sea ===
Shortly after declaring war, Denmark–Norway swiftly dispatched two of Tranquebar's finest vessels towards Bengal, where they successfully captured a ship that they later renamed Den Bengalske Prise.

For the Dano-Norwegians, the war served as a means to finance their company, a vital source of revenue during the period from 1639 to 1668, when the company faced dissolution and resurrection, with no reinforcements arriving from Denmark to assist in Asia. The Danes exhibited a clear inclination towards financial gain, with their primary focus lying on maximizing profits rather than directly attacking the Mughals. They particularly targeted ships returning from Southeast Asia due to their immensely valuable cargoes.

Danish seizures of Bengali ships became alarmingly frequent for the Mughals, and a letter from Willem Leyel states " they were doing their best to cause the Bengalis as much harm as possible," The repercussions of these seizures took a severe toll on the businesses and professional lives of Bengali individual merchants, instilling a deep fear that discouraged them from venturing to sea, fearful of potential capture by the Danes. Resistance against the Danish sailors was scarce. According to Danish colonial historian Gunnar Olsen, the Bengalis exhibited a sense of resignation, as described in his writings. "the Bengalis seem to have given up in advance on any form of resistance against the Danish ships."

Although resistance was rare, it was not entirely absent. In a notable incident off the Gingeli coast in 1644, the yacht Walby intercepted two sizable Bengali ships carrying elephants, resulting in a skirmish where some of the elephants tragically perished, documenting the use of violent resistance by Bengalis. The overall lack of efficacy in resisting the Danish forces can be attributed to the stark contrast in naval warfare capabilities between the Europeans and the Mughals.

=== Land skirmishes ===
Recorded land confrontations were rare, with only two notable instances.

The initial occurrence took place in the early 1640s, prior to the official declaration of war. The Danes, stationed at Pipli under the leadership of Poul Nielsen, encountered significant financial troubles. A Persian merchant, who owed a substantial amount to the Danes, adamantly refused to settle his debts. In response, the Danes resorted to imprisoning him within his own residence. However, when this approach proved ineffective, they proceeded to seize one of his slaves and impound a portion of his goods at the Danish trading post. The Mughals, considering this a violation of their sovereignty, promptly dispatched a force of 300 men to seize and set ablaze the Danish trading station. All the confiscated goods were taken and the Danish factors were imprisoned, although Nielsen and several others managed to escape to Tranquebar.

The second encounter occurred during the mid-1640s, following the formal declaration of war. A Danish vessel, carrying a crew of six, was wrecked along the Bengali coast. The surviving crew members were subsequently detained by the Bengalis, prompting the initiation of a Danish rescue operation. Led by Nielsen, a group of 16 men set out towards the Mughal governor's residence in Pipli, where the captured crew was rumored to be held captive. They confronted the guards, causing the governor to hastily flee. However, their search yielded no sign of the castaways. Nielsen then proposed investigating the town hall, which was vigilantly guarded by soldiers who had already been informed of the ongoing mission. Despite the guards' alertness, the Danes managed to overpower several of them, forcing the others to flee. Subsequently, they gained access to the town hall, where they discovered the castaways confined in formidable iron chains. Remarkably, the Danish rescue mission achieved its objective with minimal casualties and zero fatalities.

== Danish manifesto ==
A Portuguese-written manifesto was crafted to justify the Danish stance. Bearing the date August 24, 1644, this concise document spans five pages and serves to outline the grievances the Danes sought to address. Commencing with the Danish loss of Jupiter, a vessel carrying valuable cargo, as well as the subsequent imprisonment of its crew in 1625. Additionally, it recounts the distressing incident involving the abduction of a young Danish boy, who was forcefully converted to Islam and disappeared without a trace. The documents blame the Mughal governor for both instances. Then it explains how the Danes stopped trading in Bengal because of these "robberies, offenses and tyrannies."

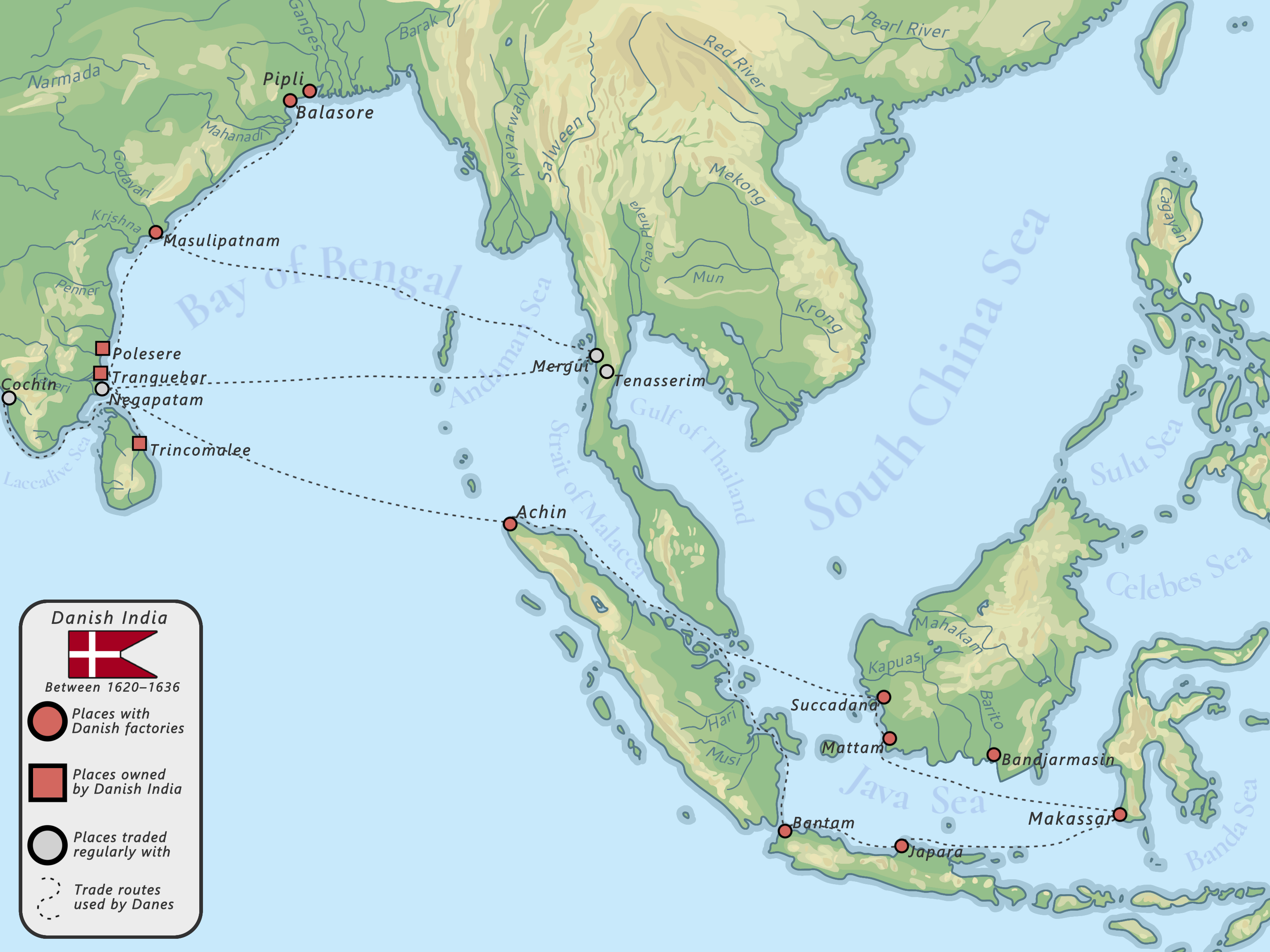
Danish India under Roland Crappé between 1620 and 1636.

It also describes several other instances of Mughal aggression like the Mughal governor's obstruction of commerce, the assault on Danish factors at Pipli, and the poisoning of shipwrecked Danish servants. Some of these instances are rejected by scholars. (Note: Numerous scholars have doubted the likelihood that the locals would have deliberately poisoned the Danes.)

The manifesto, in its essence, appears as trying to portray their enemy's lack of morality and shame, while simultaneously underscoring the Danish continued willingness to negotiate.

== Failed negotiations ==
Because of the lack of naval power, the Mughals sought to put an end to the war by instead negotiating and making compromises with the Danes. First in 1645, where they offered 80,000 rupees in compensation for peace. Yet Danish governor, Willem Leyel, rejected the offer, hoping to instead receive 436,500 rix-dollars. Leyel instead intensified the fighting.

The Mughals again tried to compromise with Denmark in 1647 or early 1648 but did not result in any significant peace.

In 1647, the Danish instructions stated that for peace to be established with the Bengalis, three conditions had to be met.

1. A substantial cash payment was required
2. The Danes were to be granted equal trading privileges as the Dutch
3. Arrangements were to be made for the forgiveness of all debts that Pessart had incurred in Masulipatnam

Having themselves failed to negotiate with the Danes, the Mughals instead tried to pressure other European colonial powers to intervene. After a Danish seizure of two large Bengali ships, the Mughals were enraged Yet they could not revenge the Danes because the Danish East India Company no longer had any territory inside of the Mughal Empire. Therefore Shah Shuja, Mughal Prince, made an ultimatum for the Dutch East India Company to either stop Danish aggression or leave Bengal, However, after discussions, he was persuaded against pursuing the ultimatum.

In 1649, local authorities attempted a similar action by refusing favorable trading terms from the VOC, if the Dutch could not assure the protection of their merchants against the Danes. The Dutch, deeming this proposition as ridiculous, rejected it. VOC eventually accepted the protections of merchants with Muslim backgrounds, against Danish aggression.

The loyalty of certain Danish Company servants added complexity to the peace negotiations. Christian IV had a strong bond with the Danish East India Company, so much so that he became the "Head and Lord of the whole Company" in 1629. He had consistently declined to dissolve the Company, even though it was not profitable, due to concerns about losing his reputation in Denmark and abroad. The company was eventually dissolved (Note: The initial company was in operation from 1616 to 1650, while the second company existed between 1670 and 1729, before being re-established in 1730 as the Asiatic Company (Danish: Asiatisk Kompagni), .) after Christian's death when informed about its dissolution, the Danish factors stationed in Asia had no choice but to continue operating the Asian settlements as they were the property of the Crown.

== 1669–1698 ==
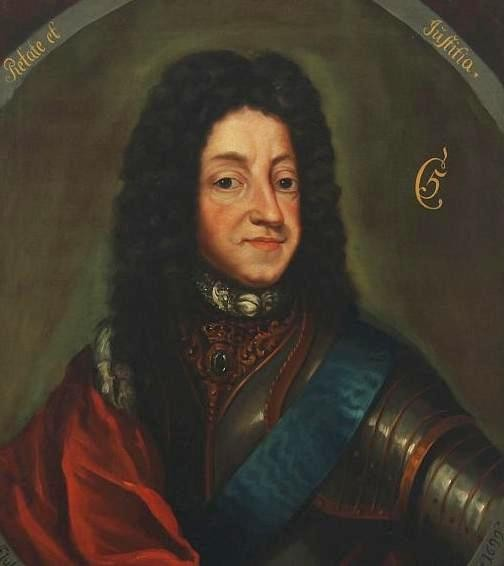
Christian V of Denmark

After the dissolution of the first company and conflicts at home, relations between Denmark-Norway and Tranquebar were re-established in 1669 after a successful expedition by the frigate Færø in 1668, which resulted in the renewal of Danish interests in the region. In 1672 Christian V wrote a letter to the Mughals, asking for compensation for Danish vessels during the conflict. The compensation was never fulfilled, and the Danes became increasingly frustrated and even chased and blew up two greater vessels near Hughli. The incidents and skirmishes continued, until eventually, the Danes felt the absence of the Bengali market and decided to resume negotiations.

== Peace ==
A provisional peace was agreed upon in 1674. However, this period of peace was short-lived as the Danes continued to pillage Bengali merchants for their own financial benefit. Danish hostilities were renewed against Bengal after the vessel Christianshavn was wrecked by the local faujdar (commander responsible for administering sub-districts) according to the Danish claims. Danish harassment of both hostile but also peaceful Bengali merchants went on until the late seventeenth century. The Danes wished to regain their influence in Bengal by re-establishing their presence in the region. They yet again tried to negotiate peace with the Mughals, this time succeeding.

In 1698, Andreas Andræ, along with Thomas Schmertz, was dispatched to Bengal by the Danish government. They arrived with ships, Indian servants, money, goods, and Danish settlers with the intention of establishing a trading presence in the region. Andræ successfully negotiated a peace agreement with the Bengali governor, Mohammed Ajumadi, wherein both parties agreed to set aside their claims over previously confiscated ships. The Danish delegates also gifted 15,000 rupees and four cannons to the prince. Moreover, Andræ secured a lease for a plot of land at Gondalapara close to the French settlement of Chandernagore for 30,000 rupees to be paid over a period of ten years. This area eventually became known as Dannemarksnagore, where the Danes established a trading post that served as the foundation for their operations in Bengal.

== See also ==
- Danish East India Company – Defunct Danish trading company
- Battle of Buxar – 1764 battle of the Bengal War
- Dutch East India Company – 1602–1799 Dutch trading company
- Bahadur Shah I – Mughal emperor from 1707 to 1712
- Ove Gjedde – Danish nobleman and Admiral of the Realm
- Cattle War – Conflict between Danish India and the Thanjavur Maratha kingdom
- Siege of Dansborg (1644) – Siege in Tranquebar, India 1644
