= Journal of Early Modern History =

- Discipline: Early Modern History
- Language: English
- Edited by: Molly A. Warsh

Publication details
- History: 1997-present
- Publisher: Brill Publishers
- Frequency: Bimonthly

Standard abbreviations
- ISO 4: J. Early Mod. Hist.

Indexing
- ISSN: 1385-3783 (print); 1570-0658 (web)
- OCLC no.: 50924580

Links
- Journal homepage

The Journal of Early Modern History is a peer-reviewed academic journal focusing on the early modern period. It is the official journal of the University of Minnesota Center for Early Modern History, and is published by Brill since 1997. The editor is Molly A. Warsh of the University of Pittsburgh.
