= Museum Tusculanum Press =

Dutch independent academic press

Museum Tusculanum Press (Danish: Museum Tusculanums Forlag) is an independent academic press historically associated with the University of Copenhagen, publishing mainly in the humanities, social sciences and theology. It was founded in 1975 as a non-profit institution and publishes approximately 45 titles annually. A large part of the books published by Museum Tusculanum Press are authored or edited by researchers affiliated with the University of Copenhagen.
