= Danish rescue mission to Pipli =

1644 military expedition

- Part of the Dano-Mughal War
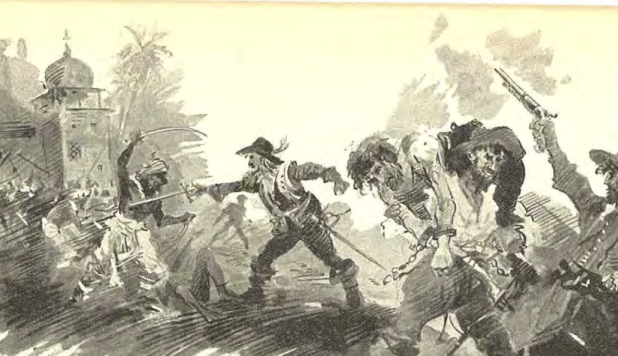
- Illustration of the mission from 1939
Date	Mid-1640s
Location	Pipli, Bengal Subah (present-day India) 22.948145°N 88.884532°E
Result	Danish victory

Belligerents
Danish India	Mughal Empire; Supported by: (Dutch East India Company) Dutch Bengal

Commanders and leaders
(Danish India) Poul Nielsen (Danish India) Carsten Ludvigsen	Unknown governor

Units involved
(Danish India) Christianshavn	Local guards (Dutch East India Company) Lis

Strength
17 men	Unknown

Casualties and losses
2 wounded	"Some" guards killed

The Danish rescue mission to Pipli (Danish: Den danske redningsaktion til Pipli, also called Pipili) refers to a rescue mission by the Danish East India Company to rescue, then recently, imprisoned Danes from Mughal imprisonment at the trading station of Pipely. The mission was successful and the six imprisoned Danes were freed. The mission can also be referred to as the Mission to pipli.

== Background ==
During the Dano-Mughal War, most of the warfare occurred at sea, this was positive for the Danish navy, who, even though being poorly equipped compared to other Europeans, still had an advantage against the Mughals in naval warfare. This advantage was however not so large that it could not be challenged if the Mughal Empire adopted a policy of using maritime violence for commercial and political purposes.

In contrast, the warfare on land was the opposite. There were only two recorded instances of land warfare between the Mughals and the Danes. The first was the destruction of the Danish trade factory at Pipli, by a Mughal force of 300 men.

=== Prelude ===
The second and last instance of a land confrontation between the Mughal and Danish armies was also at Pipli. A ship, with a crew of six persons, was wrecked off the Bengali coast. Its crew reached safely ashore only to realize that they were on enemy territory. They hid in the nearby forest until afterdark when they headed towards the river mouth near Pipli. When they arrived at Pipli, they sighted a Dutch ship anchored in the river.

The Dutch sent a boat to pick up the castaways and promised to take them back to the nearby Danish ship of Christianshavn. However, the Bengalis spotted the Danish castaways and demanded their initial surrender. The Dutch acquiesced and left the castaways to the Bengalis who imprisoned them. Coincidentally, the Danes on board on Christianshavn nearby were that same day on land for fresh water and provisions. When they chatted with the Dutch, they found out about the imprisonment of the castaways, and quickly launched a rescue mission that same night.

== Mission ==
A small force consisting of two commanders, notably Poul Nielsen and Carsten Ludvigsen, eight Danish sailors, and seven men from Tranquebar, was sent ashore. The small force rowed along the river into Pipli at midnight. Because of earlier connections with the Danish trade factory at Pipli, Nielsen could easily navigate the army to the local governor's house, where he suspected the imprisoned castaways to be located.

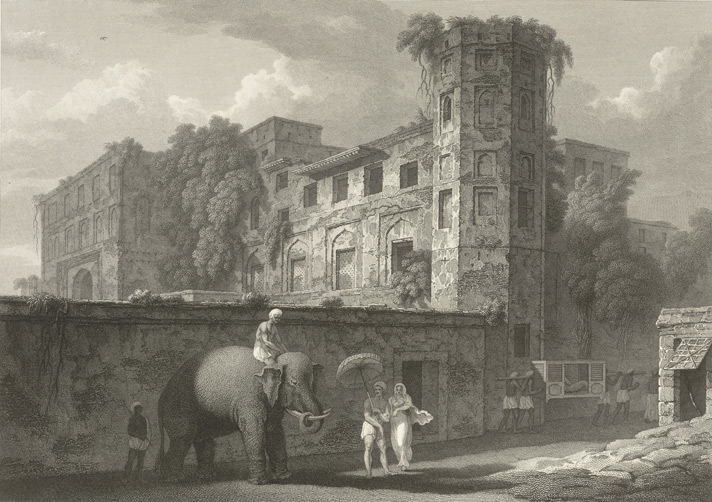
The Bara Katra, Dhaka (1823) by Charles D'Oyly.

=== Assault on the governor's house ===
With sabre, pistols, and axes, the Danes stormed the governor's house with high screams. They overran the guards at the door and shot some of them. In a panic, the Bengalis ran around confused and shouting "The Danes! The Danes!" In the initial turmoil, the local governor escaped through a backdoor and rode away on his horse. The Danes hastily searched the house but to no avail of finding the castaways.

=== Skirmish at the town hall ===
Nielsen then thought that the castaways could be located in the town hall. When the small force reached the town hall, they were met by a group of soldiers, that had heard the shots from the assault on the governor's house. It came to a short but bloody skirmish, where some of the Bengali soldiers were killed and the rest fled. After the two successes, the Danes found the door to the town hall to be locked, yet with their axes they quickly got inside and found the six imprisoned castaways.

Yet again, another problem arose for the Danes. The imprisoned castaways had iron chains around their legs, which slowed their mobility. Meanwhile, the whole city was now awake, and there were soon cannon shots and arrows shot at the Danes. Though the whole force and castaways made it to their chialoup.

== Aftermath ==
The next morning the whole rescue force and the freed castaways made it to the ship Christianshavn, where the heavy iron chains finally could be taken off the castaways. No Danes were seriously damaged. Only one man had got a sword cut over the shoulder and another an arrow through his arm.

The Mughals could have prevented the Danes from freeing their comrades, if the number of guards and soldiers was greater, the only reason for the Danish success was their element of surprise.

== See also ==
- Mirza Mumin's assault – 1642 assualt of a Danish factory in Bengal
- Dutch Bengal – Directorate of the Dutch East India Company in Mughal Bengal
- Dannemarksnagore
- Expulsion of Danes from Balasore – 1643/1644 Dano-Mughal War confrontation
