= Mirza Mumin's assault =

1642 assualt of a Danish factory in Bengal

- Part of the prelude to the Dano-Mughal War
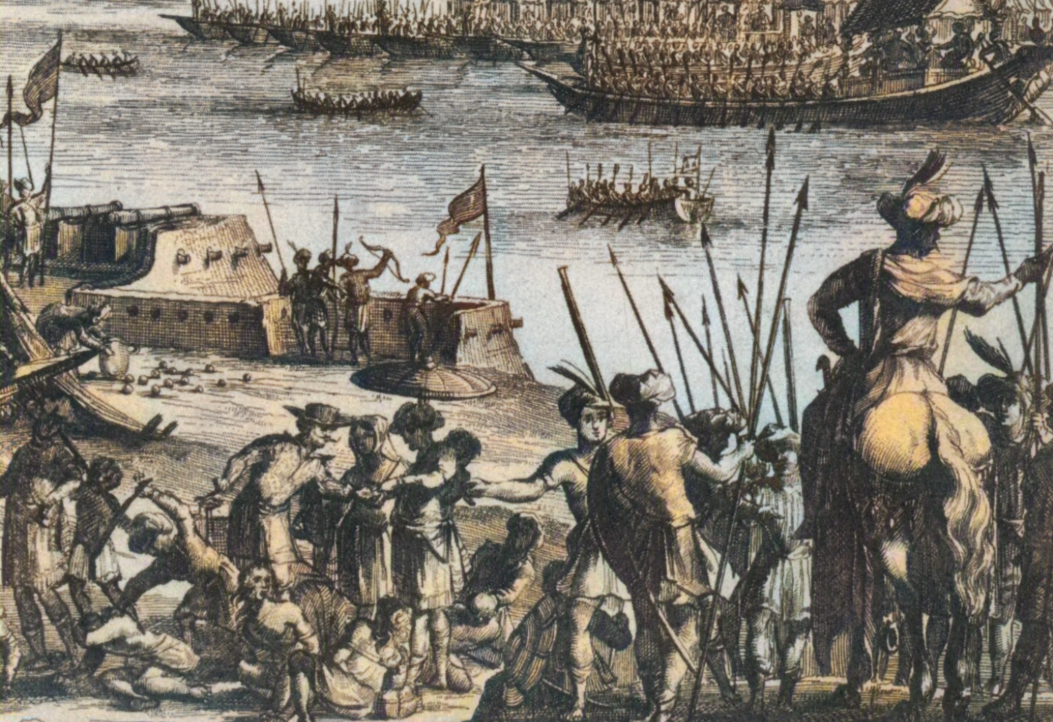
- Engraving showing the faujdar of Pipli meeting Arakanese people in 1676
Date	Late 1641
Location	Pipli, Mughal Empire (near present-day Kirtania Port, India) 21°33′51″N 87°20′11″E
Result	Mughal victory
Territorial changes	Danish factory at Pipli is destroyed

Belligerents
Mughal Empire; Bengal Subah	Danish India

Commanders and leaders
Mirza Mumin; Unk. Nawab	(Danish India) Poul Nielsen (POW) (Danish India) Unk. lower merchant (POW)

Units involved
Great Mughal's troops	(Danish India) Sepoys

Strength
300 men	Unknown, but minor

Casualties and losses
Unknown	All imprisoned

Mirza Mumin's assault and subsequent destruction of the Danish factory at Pipli in Bengal by Mughal forces occurred in late 1641.

After having problems with collecting debts from a local Persian merchant, the Danes at their factory in Pipli arrested the Persian, taking his slave and goods into custody as he escaped imprisonment. Followingly, the faujdar of Pipli, Mirza Mumin, and the local Mughal Nawab intervened, sending an army of 300 men to the Danish factory. The factory was taken and levelled to the ground, while the Danes were imprisoned and transported to Cuttack, with only some managing to escape.

== Background ==
In 1616, the Danish East India Company was founded, and after a successful expedition to India in 1620, it established the colony of Tranquebar. A few years later, a Danish factory was established at Pipli in Bengal.

After having left the factory in charge of Indian caretakers in 1626, the Danes again took the factory in Pipli into use following a promise from local Mughal merchants in c. 1635 to give the Danes a firman from the Mughal Emperor, Shah Jahan. In c. 1640, the Danish factory was led by a chief merchant (overkøbmand), named Poul Nielsen, with another merchant under him. In addition to a couple of Danish commoners and Indian trade officers, the Danes had employed a minor force of Indian soldiers from Tranquebar to protect against thieves and outlaws.

=== Prelude ===
==== Tariffs and prohibitions ====
Trade did well during Roland Crappé's tenure as the governor of Tranquebar; however, as soon as Danish trade made a surplus, the Danes' relation with the faujdar of Pipli, Mirza Mumin, (Note: Kay Larsen also mentioned him as a viceroy.) became unfriendly. Mumin subsequently made demands and imposed tariffs and prohibitions on the Danes, which favored the Dutch in the city, while damaging the Danes. According to Danish author Asta Bredsdorff, the demands were unduly high and unfair to the extent that it was impossible to fulfil.

Furthermore, when Bernt Pessart succeeded Crappé, economic difficulties arose, and the Mughals' self-confidence grew as the D.E.I.C.'s reputation declined. Consequently, in 1639, Mirza Mumin even prevented a Danish ship from obtaining cargo there, which Danish colonial historian Kay Larsen claimed seemed to indicate that either the tariffs were unpaid or the Danes' gifts to the local Mughal Nawab were not given sufficiently. Larsen additionally speculated that the factory had similar problems with disorder to those in Tranquebar. (Note: In the same period, two Danish priests, Niels Andersen and Christian Pedersen Storm, had caused great disorder in Tranquebar.)

==== Problems with collecting debts ====
In addition to the economic difficulties, the Danes had problems with collecting debts from local merchants, who were untrustworthy and always sought protection from Mirza Mumin.

== Assault ==
=== Arresting a Persian ===
In late 1641, Poul Nielsen could not collect the company's debts from a notorious Persian merchant. The merchant refused to pay back his considerable debt despite continuous inquiries, and when Mirza Mumin would not help, Nielsen took the matter into his own hands: He ordered a Danish guard in the factory to arrest the Persian in his own home. Nevertheless, the Persian escaped, to whom Nielsen sent armed men into the city to find him. When this was unsuccessful, the Danes took one of his female slaves and some of his goods and brought them to the Danish factory in custody.

=== Nawab's intervention ===
However, the Mughal government could not tolerate the Danish vigilantism, and, consequently, Mumin and the local Nawab now intervened militarily and gathered an army of 300 men of the Great Mughal's troops. According to Indian historian Lalit Mohan Mitra, this pretext was slim; however, American historian of Southeast Asia, Kathryn Wellen, presumes that the Mughals viewed the Danish acts as a breach of sovereignty.

==== Assault on the factory ====
The army now attacked the factory, first besieging it, and thereafter overwhelming it after catching the Danes off guard. Subsequently, the warehouses were plundered, and the factory was levelled to the ground by fire. The Danish goods were seized, and the Danes themselves were imprisoned and transported inland to Cuttack in chains.

== Aftermath ==
=== Fate of the Danes in Cuttack ===
In Cuttack, the Danes were severely mistreated. Nonetheless, after some time, Poul Nielsen and some others managed to escape by a vessel and reached Tranquebar in the summer of 1642.

=== Casus belli for the Dano-Mughal War ===
The D.E.I.C. estimated the loss of the factory at 5 barrels (0.79 m^{3}) of gold. As a result, the incident, together with the grounding of St. Jacob, damaged the company's economy to such an extent that the Danes were now forced to use extreme means. Accordingly, in 1642, the governor of Tranquebar, Bernt Pessart, declared war on the Mughal Empire, which was indirectly attributed to Mirza Mumin. A couple of years later, in 1644, the new governor of Tranquebar, Willem Leyel, launched his privateering campaign against the Mughal Empire with compensation from hostile Mughal actions as the primary goal for the campaign. Consequently, Leyel's manifesto justifying the war mentions that the Danes abandoned trade in Bengal as a result of the hostile Mughal actions and the impossibility of receiving compensation.

== See also ==
- Raid on Dannemarksnagore – 1713 raid of a Danish colony in Bengal
- Danish rescue mission to Pipli – 1644 military expedition
- Expulsion of Danes from Balasore – 1643/1644 Dano-Mughal War confrontation

== Notes and citations ==
=== Works cited ===
- Larsen, Kay (1908). De dansk-ostindiske koloniers historie – De Bengalske loger & Nikobarerne [History of the Danish East Indian Colonies – The Bengali Lodges & the Nicobar Islands] (in Danish). Vol. 2. Copenhagen, Denmark: Centralforlaget – via Danskernes Historie Online.
- Larsen, Kay (1935). Ipsen, Poul (ed.). "En lille dansk Søkrig i Indien" [A Little Danish Naval War] (PDF). Tidsskrift for Søvæsen. 106. Copenhagen, Denmark: Søe-Lieutenant-Selskabet – via Marinehistorisk Selskab.
- Bredsdorff, Asta (1 January 1999). Willem Leyels liv og farefulde rejse til Indien [The Trials and Travels of Willem Leyel] (PDF). Søhistoriske Skifter. Vol. 21. Copenhagen, Denmark: Museum Tusculanum Press. ISBN 87-7289-498-9. ISSN 0107-6647.
- Wellen, Kathryn (2015). "The Danish East India Company's War against the Mughal Empire, 1642-1698" (PDF). Journal of Early Modern History. 19 (5). Leiden, the Netherlands: Brill Publishers: 439–461. doi:10.1163/15700658-12342470. eISSN 1568-5209. ISSN 0022-4995.
- Mitra, Lalit Mohan (September 1952). The Danes in Bengal (PDF) (1st ed.). Kolkata, India: Prabartak Publishers. p. 15 – via Internet Archive.
- Larsen, Kay (September 1907). Munch, Peter Rochegune (ed.). "Danske Kapertogter i den bengalske Havbugt" [Danish Privateer Voyages in the Bay of Bengal]. Det ny Aarhunderede. 4. Copenhagen, Denmark: Harvard Library – via Internet Archive.
