= Grand Mughal =

Title for Indian ruler

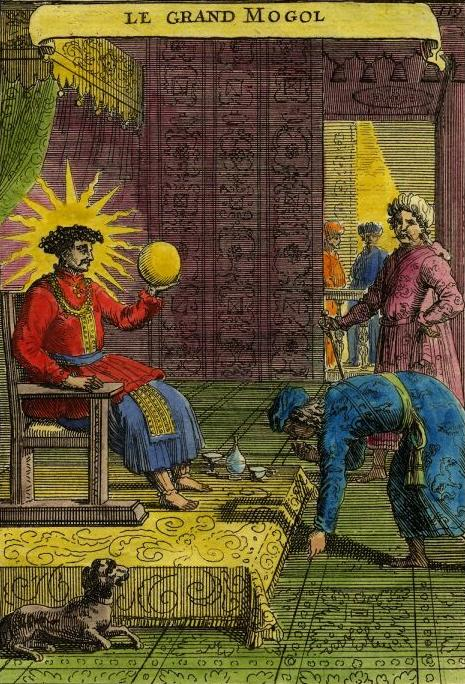
Le Grand Mogol ("The Grand Mughal") as imagined by French cartographer Alain Manesson Mallet (Paris, 1683)

Grand Mughal or Mogul, also Great Mughal or Mogul, is a title coined by Europeans for the ruler of the Mughal Empire of India. The Mughals themselves used the title Padishah. The title is especially associated with the third in the line, Akbar the Great (1542–1605). It is said that the Portuguese called Akbar the Grand Mughal and sent Jesuit missionaries to convert him to Catholicism.

The Mughal empire was romanticized in Europe, particularly from the sixteenth century onward. The empire's court at Agra, for instance, was often described in glowing terms. An account stated that it was not uncommon for Britons living in India to adopt the Mughal culture.

Mughal rule persisted until the mid-nineteenth century, ending in 1857. After the Indian Rebellion of 1857, Bahadur Shah Zafar, the last Mughal emperor, was exiled by the British to Myanmar, where he spent the rest of his life in prison.

== See also ==
- Ottoman sultan, also known as the "Grand Turk"
