= Expulsion of Danes from Balasore =

1643/1644 Dano-Mughal War confrontation

- Part of the Dano-Mughal War
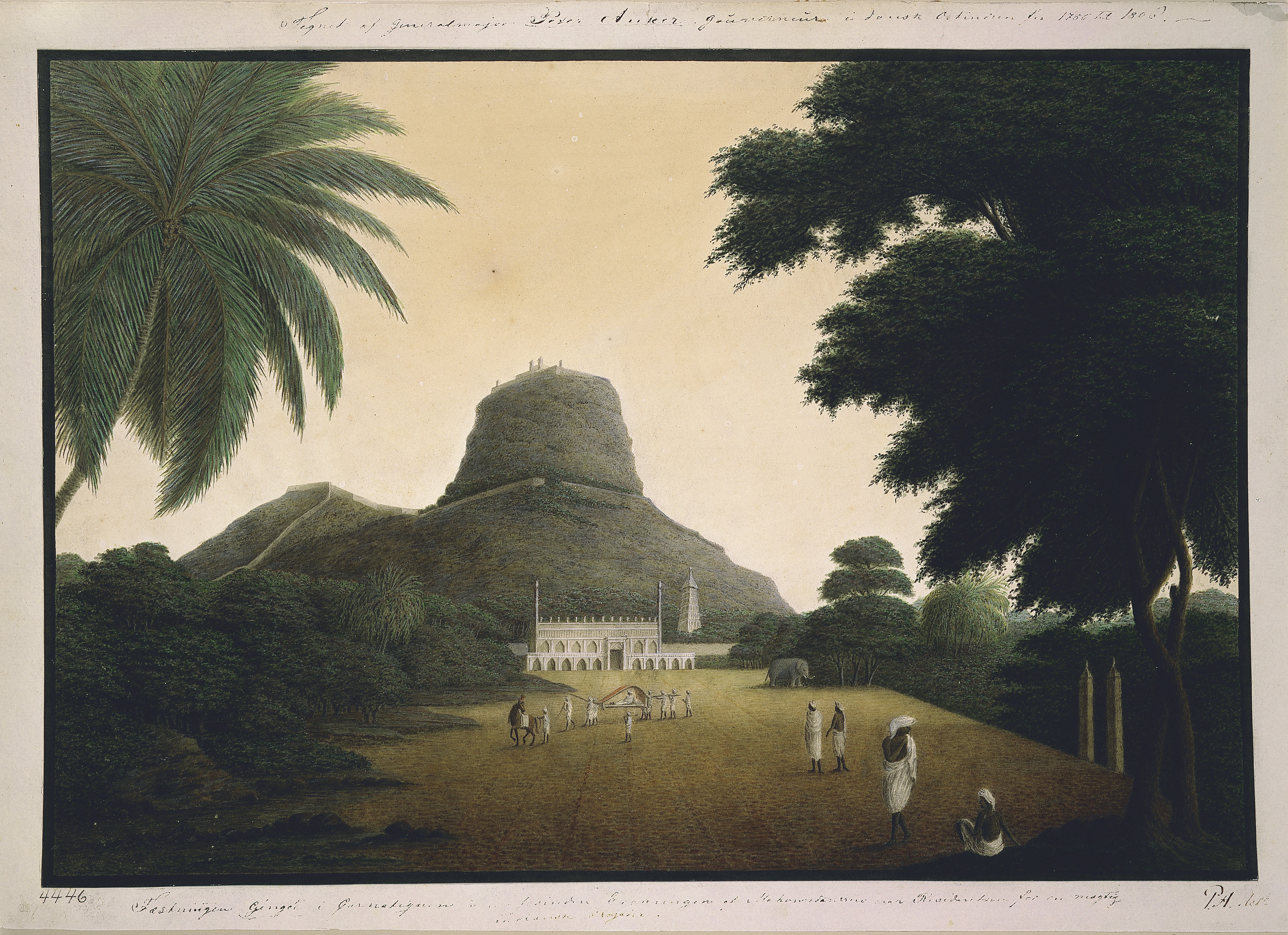
- The fortress of Gingee in Karnatik, part of the Mughal Empire. By Dano-Norwegian Peter Anker.
Date	1643/1644
Location	Balasore, Mughal Empire (present-day India) 21°30′12″N 86°55′30″E
Result	Mughal victory
Territorial changes	Danish factory at Balasore abandoned

Belligerents
Mughal Empire	Danish India

Commanders and leaders
Malik Beg	(Danish India) Unknown

Units involved
Unknown	None

Strength
Unknown	c. 40 people

Casualties and losses
None	c. 40 poisoned All goods seized

The Expulsion of Danes from Balasore (Danish: Udvisningen af danskerene fra Balasore) was a violent expulsion and ousting of the Danish East India Company from the Mughal harbour and trading hub of Balasore in 1643 or 1644 by the local Mughal governor, Malik Beg.

== Background ==
In 1620, Danish India was established at Tranquebar. One year later, Roland Crappé became Governor of Tranquebar, establishing a far-flung string of Danish factories from Malabar to Sulawesi. One of these factories was established at Balasore in Bengal, where the Danes sat up an office and staff.

== Expulsion ==
Balasore remained as a Danish trading post and factory until 1643 or 1644, when Malik Beg, the Mughal governor of Balasore, came in a quarrel with the Danish factors. It is said that Malik Beg poisoned the Danish inhabitants, which were about 40 people, and seized their goods, which they had acquired from the area. As a result, Malik Beg demolished the Danish factory at Balasore, and the Danes who lived there were either poised or expelled.

== Aftermath ==
As a result of this and other incidents, the governor of the Danish East India Company, Bernt Pessart, declared war on the Mughal Empire, which would last until 1698. The Danes would reestablish their factory at Balasore in 1674 when 2 Danish vessels captured 5 Bengali ships, in which the Mughal governor, Malik Kasim, promised to give them the same trading privileges as the English.

== See also ==
- Skirmish at Pipli – 1642 assualt of a Danish factory in Bengal
- Loss of the St. Jacob – 1640 grounding of a Danish ship
- Attack in Hooghly – 1671 Danish attack on Bengali vessels in Hooghly
- Siege of Dansborg (1624) – Siege on Danish fort in India, 1624

== Works cited ==
- Bhaduri, Saugata (2021-12-30). Polycoloniality: European Transactions with Bengal from the 13th to the 19th Century. Bloomsbury Publishing. ISBN 978-93-89812-56-5.
- Wellen, Kathryn (2015). The Danish East India Company's War against the Mughal Empire, 1642-1698 (PDF). Royal Netherlands Institute for Southeast Asian and Caribbean Studies.
- Bredsdorff, Asta (2009). The Trials and Travels of Willem Leyel. Copenhagen: Museum Tusculanum Press. ISBN 9788763530231.
- Diller, Stephan (1999). Die Dänen in Indien, Südostasien und China (1620-1845) (in German). Otto Harrassowitz Verlag. ISBN 978-3-447-04123-2.
