= Thirty Years' War outside Europe =

1618–1651 theater of war

This article refers to the interconnected military, naval, economic, and informational developments that occurred outside Europe during the Thirty Years' War (1618–1648). Although the conflict is traditionally portrayed as a Central European and intra-imperial war, several Atlantic, African, and Asian theatres significantly influenced its outcome. These overseas dimensions involved mainly the pro-Habsburg and Catholic Iberian Union (Spain and Portugal) against the anti-Habsburg and Protestant coalition (Dutch Republic, England, and various chartered trading companies), whose colonial rivalries reshaped the economic foundations of European states engaged in the war and were intimately related in the diplomatic and strategic area. This generally involved skirmishes and naval blockades (mainly to seize colonial outposts or trade ships) rather than large pitched battles.

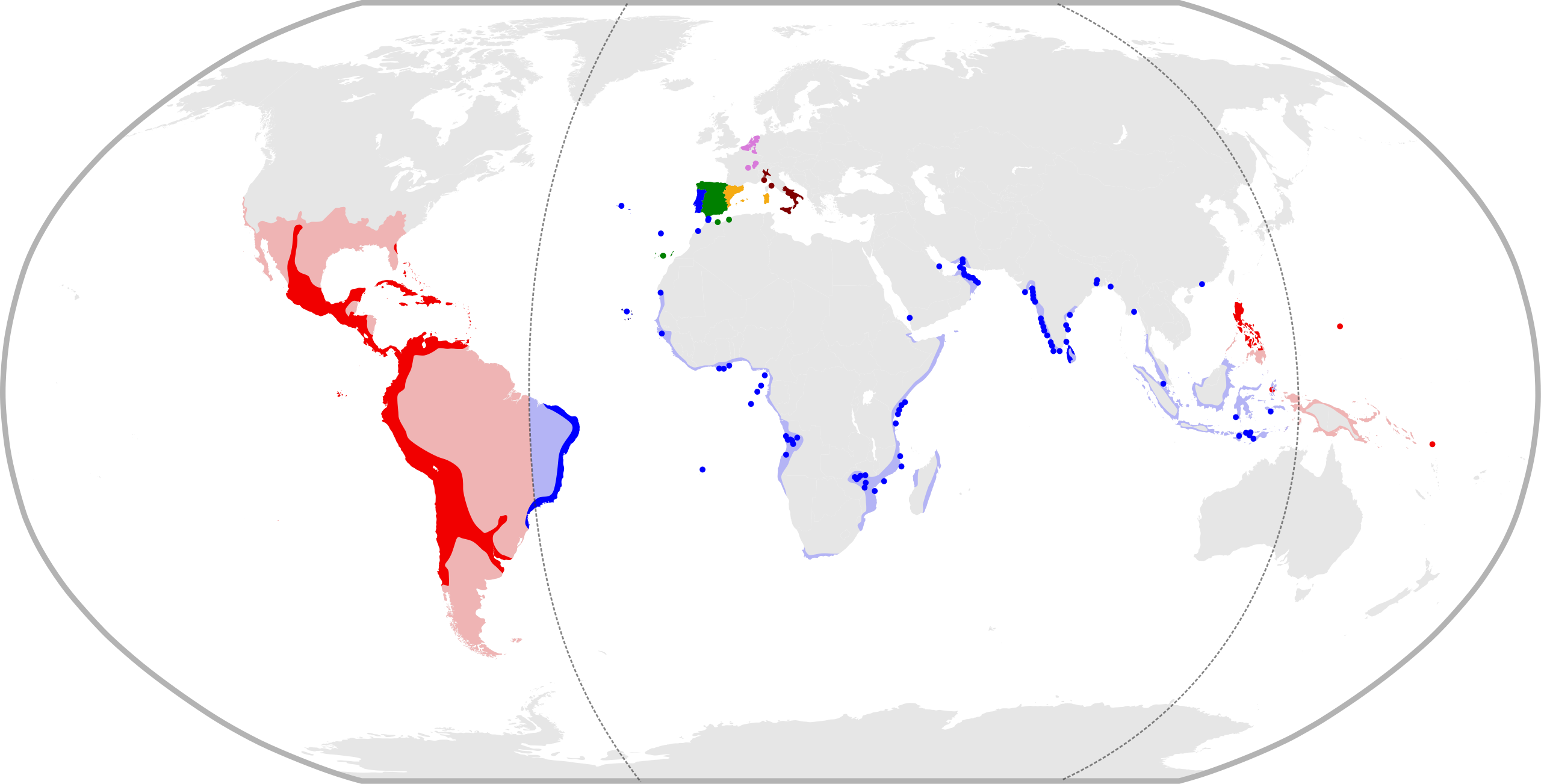
The Iberian Union around the world, in which succeeded the main oversea conflicts related to the Thirty Years' War

== Historiography ==
Since the mid-20th century, historians have emphasized that the Thirty Years' War was not merely a German civil war but concerned much of Europe. Then more recent scholarship has taken the next interpretive step by situating the war within early modern globalization. For this historiography, the Thirty Years' War can be described as the first pan-European colonial war, due to the war's international scale and the involvement of colonial empires (mainly the ones of the Iberian Union against the Dutch, English, Danish and French colonial empire), being this oversea conflict so intense that some have dubbed it the true "First World War".

Thirty Years' War global coalitions from the Iberian Union's diplomatic perspective

While the wider European significance of the war has since been fully recognized, historians like John Pike, Johannes Müller, Geoffrey Parker, John K. Thornton, Wim Klooster, Peter H. Wilson, Sanjay Subrahmanyam, Jonathan Israel, etc. have only recently begun to place it in a global context by more systematically integrating its various Trans-Oceanic side stages into their analyses. The global perspective emphasizes three main factors:

- Colonial and maritime warfare, especially Dutch–Portuguese and Dutch–Spanish conflicts.
- Transoceanic bullion flows, particularly the Spanish treasure fleets that financed Imperial and Habsburg armies.
- A transcontinental news culture, which integrated events from Brazil, the Caribbean, West Africa, and the Indian Ocean into European political discourse.

== Background ==
=== The Iberian Union and global Habsburg warfare ===
In 1580, Philip II of Spain also became ruler of the Portuguese Empire, creating the Iberian Union, the largest connected overseas domain of early modern era which was key in the developing of a Proto-globalization between the Old World and the New World through maritime networks. However, such rapid expansion led to a chronic shortage of soldiers and enormous debts, making Spain reluctant to expand its territory, and thus it dominated a strategy of territorial defense against its enemies. Long-standing commercial rivals, the 1602 to 1663 Dutch–Portuguese War was an offshoot of the Dutch fight for independence from Spain that will merge with the Thirty Years' War. The Portuguese dominated the trans-Atlantic economy known as the Triangular trade, in which slaves were transported from West Africa and Portuguese Angola to work on plantations in Portuguese Brazil, which exported sugar and tobacco to Europe. During the Thirty Years' War, Spain relied heavily on American silver and on maritime routes to sustain its European armies. The vulnerability of these oceanic links (specially from the Portuguese empire in Asia) made the overseas theatres strategically decisive.

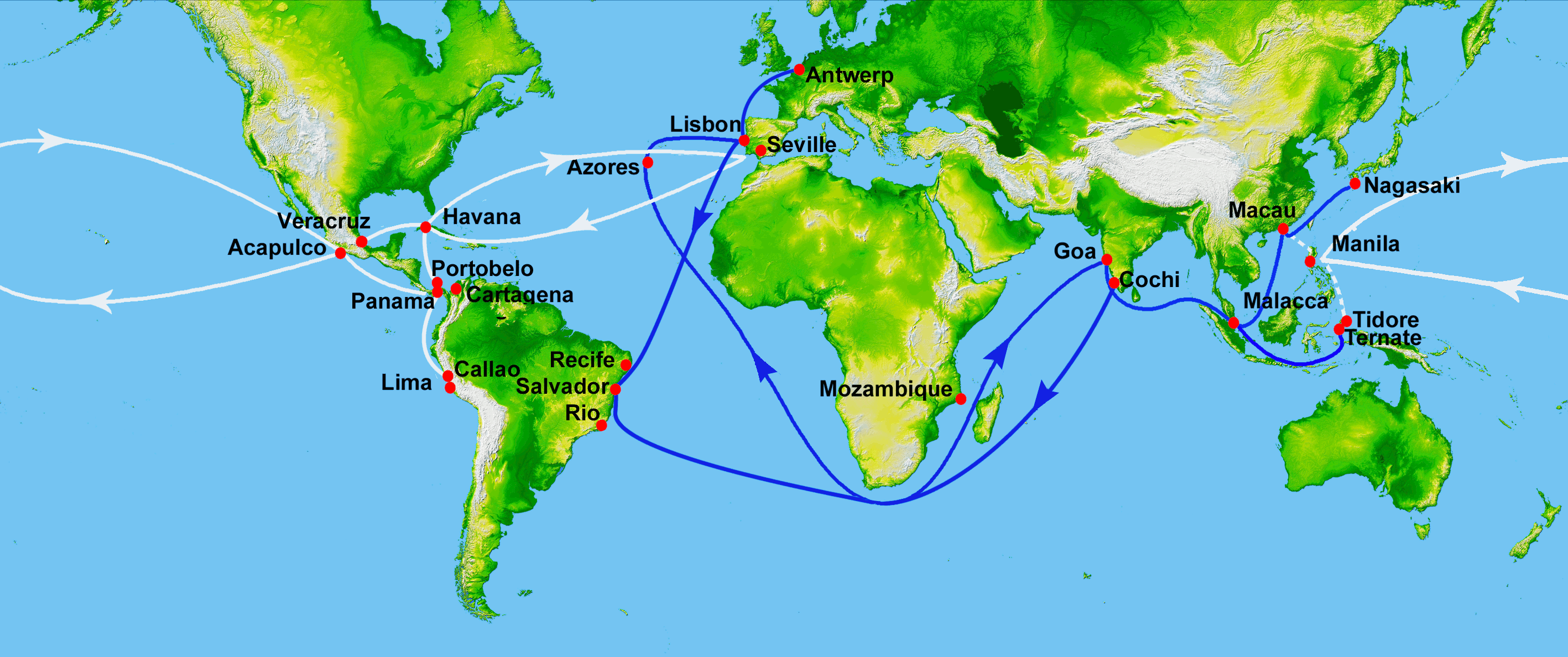
Iberian Union main trade routes around the world

Every year, two Spanish treasure fleets (protected by a convoy system of galeones) sailed from the Americas (Callao or Veracruz) to Seville's Casa de Contratación, transporting Potosi and Zacatecas silver with other colonial products (either local American or even Asiatic from Manila), along the road the ships take scales in ports like Panama, Cartagena de Indias, Havana, Santo Domingo, Santa Cruz de Tenerife. During those scales, they were prey of pirates and corsairs hostile to Spain, being the most dangerous scale the Cuban one in the Bahama Channel. This turned the Philippines, Spanish Main and Canary Islands into important military objectives by the Anti-Habsburg Protestant coalition. Similar destiny had the Portuguese Cafila convoy system that transported their exotic products and slaves from the factories (across the Indian Ocean and coastal Africa) to Colonial Brazil and Lisbon's Casa da Índia, which turned into military objectives the strategic Portuguese intermediaries of Macau, Malacca, Goa, Ormuz, Cape of Good Hope, Luanda, São Tomé, Gold Coast, Cape Verde, Pernambuco and the Azores. The Spanish overseas possessions were generally better defended than Portuguese ones, which were widely scattered and difficult to reinforce.

Despite the international isolation of the House of Habsburg in the worst years of the Thirty Years' War, the Republic of Genoa still was a loyal ally of Spanish Habsburgs and became the only European power that sent military help to the Spanish Empire in Oversea (mainly due to the investments with Extraterritorial rights from the Genoese Bankers in Portobelo, Panama for the Asiento de Negros). Although were not capable to bring significative maid, the Genoese reached so far that they were fighting in the Spanish Philippines at 1630s.

Union of Arms failed project to consolidate a common Luso-Spanish army at the Thirty Years' War.

Also, the Iberian Union was a Composite monarchy administrated through a Polysynodial System and under a legal pluralist constitution based in Fueros (local privileges to protect the customary law of determinated Nations and its Estates of the realm). So, the Kingdoms, States and Lordships that comprised the Hispanic Monarchy were united through aeque principaliter, so the constituent kingdoms continued to be treated as distinct entities which retained their own traditional rights, resulting in the king not having the same powers in every territory, like in the states of the Crown of Aragon and Portugal in which his authority was considerably limited by their laws and institutions (like the Constitutions of Catalonia or Portuguese Cortes), causing Castile to bear the greatest burden of the Monarchy's expenses and war efforts, with its economy ruined by a century of almost continuous colonial wars (did not help that the Indies fleets often arrived late, and utilities were not what they used to be either). That economical decline made Portuguese oversea troops to have logistical problems for lacking Castilian financiation (similar problem had the Austrian Habsburgs), and the Spanish troops to mutiny on several occasions at the Thirty Years' War due to not receiving their pay, so the Union of Arms was proposed by Count-duke of Olivares to strengthen the collaboration of all the kingdoms of the Hispanic Monarchy in a common policy of military defense contribution, but he failed to gain acceptance from the institutions of each territory due to suspects of centralisation and attempts to impose Legal Uniformism. This revealed the unstable internal relationship between the Spanish and Portuguese (who feared Castilianization) in developing a consistent foreign policy, which was exploited by Iberian Union's enemies.

=== The rise of Dutch and English naval power ===
Before Thirty Years' War, the Dutch Republic and England challenged Iberian monopoly over Atlantic and Indo-Pacific commerce. These conflicts, though rooted in earlier struggles (the Anglo-Spanish War (1585–1604) and the Eighty Years' War), became intertwined with the anti-Habsburg coalitions fighting within the Holy Roman Empire (HRE) after the end of the Twelve Years' Truce.

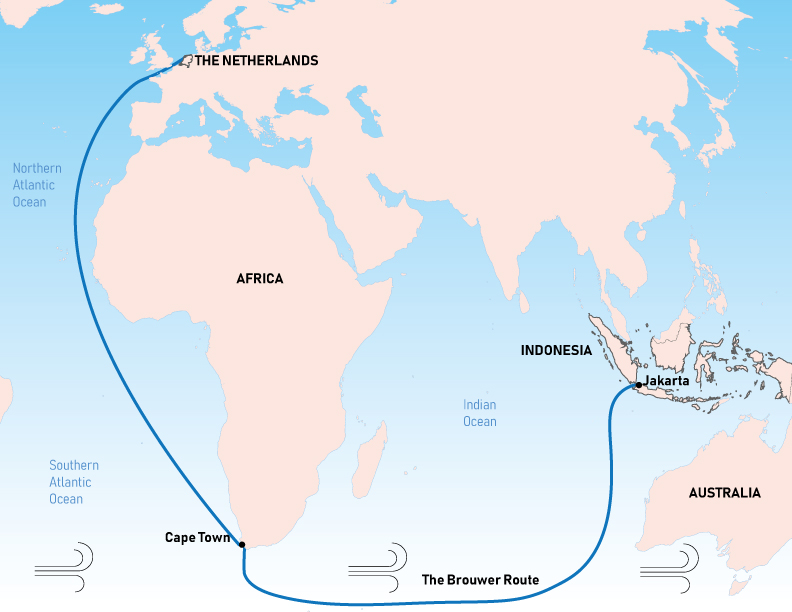
- The Brouwer Route, which played a major role for the Dutch in reaching the Far East and Oceania to harm the Portuguese presence in Asia.
  Although originally the Dutch navy goals were mainly exploratory and essentially commercial (even originally developing pacific trade with the Madeira, Canary Islands and Cape Verde merchants while the Dutch let themselves to be employed by Portuguese merchants to transport European merchandise to Brazil), since Spain closed the Portuguese ports against the Dutch in 1594, the Dutch ships adopted military purposes and started to do raids on Ibero-America, Macaronesia, the Gulf of Guinea and the Indo-Pacific (crossing the south of Equator in 1599, and even briefly occupying the Canary Islands and Sao Tome island). After the 1595-97 First Dutch Expedition to the East Indies, also the Dutch developed colonialist goals, succeeding the Dutch East India Company (VOC) in establishing factories in Java, Sumatra, Borneo, Maluku, the Malay Peninsula, and the Indian subcontinent by 1605, while gaining sovereignty over Amboina and then on Ternate in 1607, developing a naval power in the Far East that outmatched the Iberian one at Goa, Malacca and Manila (having engagements in Bantam, Changi, Amboina, Malacca, Cape Rachado, Mozambique, Pulo Buton, Philippines, Bengal, etc.; so forcing the Iberian Union to develop Luso-Castilian collaborations like the 1606 conquest of the Moluccas by Pedro de Acuña), although never consolidating a significant naval power in the Western Hemisphere, being outmatched by the Iberian counter-offensive of Don Luis Fajardo at the Araya Peninsula in 1605-06 (which was the first Spanish significant counter-offensive against Anglo-French-Dutch privateering in the West Indies). During the 1609-1621 truce there were established colonies in areas unoccupied by the Iberians, like the New Netherland, Dutch Surinam (briefly destroyed in 1614 by Spaniards of Trinidad), Dutch Gold Coast, etc. Key Dutch admirals who resalted in this early inter-colonial struggles were Paulus van Caerden, Willem Haultain de Zoete, Jacob van Heemskerck, Cornelis Matelief, Pieter Verhoeff, François Wittert, Jacques Lemaire, Joris van Spilbergen, Jan Dircksz Lam, Pieter van der Hagen, Jan Pietersz Coen, etc.
- Similar military success, although without establishing significant colonies (outside of some factories in Indonesia and Bengal), were done by the Elizabethan Sea Dogs with English admirals like Francis Drake, Thomas Cavendish and James Lancaster who did circumnavigations, by explorers like Henry Hudson or William Baffin who did discoveries in the Hudson Bay and the Northwest Passage, or diplomats like Thomas Roe and Thomas Shirley who did treaties in the Mughal Empire and Safavid Iran; while also the English having military engagements against Iberians (firstly by the Spanish Company and then the East India Company) at Newfoundland, Cape Verde, Bermuda, Colombia, Florida, Azores, West Indies, Honduras, Ecuador, Brazil, Guiana, Canary Islands, Venezuela, Panama, Mexico, Ireland, Malacca-Ternate, Swally, Surat, etc.

==== First wave of colonial chartered companies ====
An indirect effect of the Eighty Years' War was the participation of new European powers in the first wave of colonialism. Due to the successes of the VOC in defy the Iberian Mare clausum of Tordesillas and to spread Protestantism in the New World against the "Papist heresies", a lot of Protestant great powers tried to imitate the Dutch Empire with their system of Chartered companies (in which colonies were projects of private investor with the protection of the monarchy as a shareholder) that seemed to be cheaper for the state and less risky than attempting colonies with direct control and inversion from the Crown Treasury (which was the system applied in the Spanish viceroyalties), desiring to develop colonial empires capable to military defy the one of the Habsburg Spain. Also France, despite being catholic, imitated the system in an attempt to defy the Papal concession to the Iberian Monarchies as the only ones with rights to spread the Catholic Gospel, while also getting a part of the benefits in the International trade with the Indies. In that spirit were founding the following armored chartered companies in the early 17th century:

- Kingdom of England: East India Company, Guinea Company, Council for New England, Providence Island Company.
- Denmark-Norway: Danish East India Company.
- (yes) Swedish Empire: Swedish Indies Company, Swedish South Company
- Kingdom of France: Compagnie des Moluques, Company of One Hundred Associates, Compagnie de Saint-Christophe, Company of the American Islands.

While originally were external initiatives that were unrelated to the Thirty Years' War (and even there were inner rivalries, like the Anglo-Dutch, Anglo-French, Franco-Dutch and Dano-Swedish), several political leaders—like Maurice of Nassau, Christian IV of Denmark, Gustavus Adolphus and specially the Cardinal Richelieu—tried to integrate those in the strategic plan of the Anti-Habsburg coalition to develop a common effort to defy Portuguese and Spanish Empire with their Mare clausum monopoly. For example:

- In July 17 of 1619, diplomatic agreements in Europe (related to the renewal of war with Spain at the Thirty Years' War) convinced the Dutch States-General and English parliament to approve a pact of collaboration between the Dutch and English East India Companies (despite their rivalry in Spitzbergen, the Banda Islands and Amboina), with the goal of seizure the exploitation and defense in the Indo-Pacific region during the early 1620s.
- In the Treaty of Compiègne (1624) was stablished that Dutch colonialists should not attack French colonialists in the Far East and instead should have pacifical relations and develop trade (collaborating in the exclusion of Iberians in such), although Richeleu wanted to take a next step in pacting a militar joint-force against the Iberian colonies, the Dutch refused to allow French merchants to join voyages of the VOC.
- Both the 17th century Danish colonial policy and Swedish colonial policy would be very influenced by the Dutch foreign policy through the relevance of key people like Roland Crappé and Marchelis Boschouver (in the Danish East India Company), Willem Usselincx and Peter Minuit (in the Swedish South Company), Louis De Geer (in the Swedish Africa Company), etc. Developing the Nordics an obsession to reach the prosperity of the Spanish Empire and then defy their oversea domain. Even Usselincx attempted to promote in Netherlands and Sweden an inter-colonial alliance between the states hostile to Spain (on the grounds that the Spanish navy restricted trade with other continents), but his proposals were not fullfied due to the Torstenson War and the English Civil Wars that weakened Protestant solidarity in the International relations.

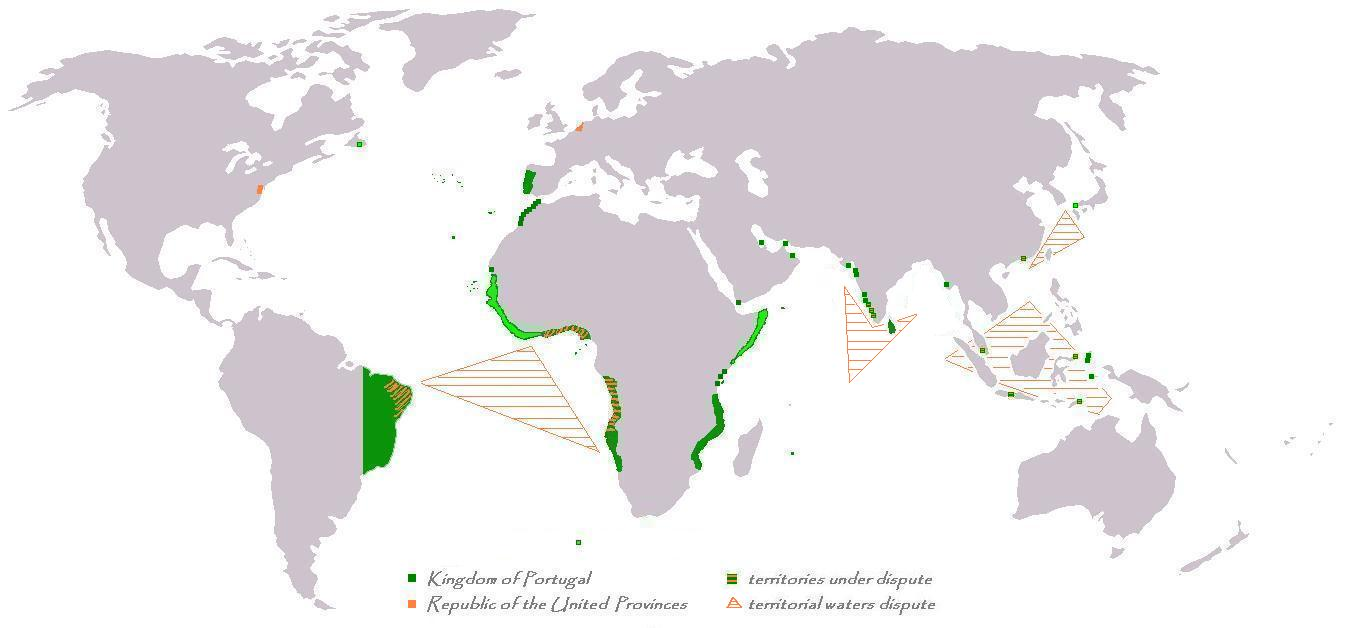
Dutch–Portuguese War warzones. The Groot Desseyn is included.

The main protagonist of the Anti-Habsburg oversea operations were the VOC, formed to develop trade routes with the East of Cape of Good Hope, and the Dutch West India Company, formed later to do the same with the West, both to overcome the Insufficient supply of the goods which the Dutch were accustomed to obtain from the Iberian Peninsula. Known by Dutch historians as the 'Great Design' (a military plan developed to conquer Iberian positions in the Atlantic Ocean, both Americans and Africans), control of this trade would not only be extremely profitable but also deprive the Spanish of funds needed to finance their war in the Netherlands. In 1621, the Dutch West India Company was formed to achieve this militar plan to control both the lucrative sugar plantations in Brazil and the Atlantic slave trade. Dutch maritime successes deprived the Spanish monarchy of revenue and ships, indirectly shaping land campaigns in Germany, Italy, the Low Countries, and even the Iberian Peninsula. The principal objectives of the Dutch were on eroding Iberian trading capabilities and establishing their own commercial hegemony globally as part of a grand, multi-faceted strategy across Europe and the wider world that was planned to be achieved at the end of the Twelve Years' Truce. Such truce did not halt Dutch commercial and colonial expansion in the Caribbean and specially the East Indies, even though Spain had tried to impose the dissolution of the VOC as a condition of the treaty. The Dutch Republic's minor concessions about the elimination of plans to create a Dutch West India Company and a halt to Portuguese encroachment in Asia were coming to an end, now with the support of France and England at the beginning of the Thirty Years' War to execute its aggressive campaign of commercial expansion to the New World by using privateers. By the time the truce ended, the Dutch were the aggressors in this global war for commercial interests; the initiative for armed conflict almost always came from the Dutch side, taking advantage of the emphasis on a defensive strategy among the Iberians due to the economic problems of the Hispanic monarchy.

Knowing of the Dutch plans to strengthen their relationships with the enemies of Spain (French–Habsburg and Anglo-Spanish rivalry) and the Catholic Church (Protestant Europe like the Nordic countries), the Iberian Union tried to apply a foreign policy of divide and conquer by wanting to develop an Anglo-Spanish alliance against the Dutch, or a Franco-Spanish alliance against the Anglo-Dutch. However, the International isolation of the Habsburg monarchy, the Anti-Catholic sentiment in English parliament and the Anti-Spanish sentiment there and the French court was too powerful. Also did not help the inner struggles between the Council of Castile (more pragmatic with the transit in international waters and condescent with the English as lesser evil than the Dutch) and the Council of Portugal (more rigid in practising Mare clausum in maritime law and belicist with both the English and Dutch), which could not agree in a common foreign policy due to the Portuguese's misguided obsession of restoring the Tordesillas duopoly and their naval supremacy in Asia against Northern Europeans and the local great Powers like the gunpowder empires (also did not want to cede any part of the Indian trade to the Castilians nor the entrance of their missionaries in the padroado in case of a Luso-Castilian joint force appeared in the Eastern Hemisphere), as also Spanish attempts to suppress Goa municipal council to strengthen Hispanic Monarchy institutionality, like the Viceroy of Portuguese India, and dismiss Luso-Asians Jesuits authority and incomes.

== Americas ==
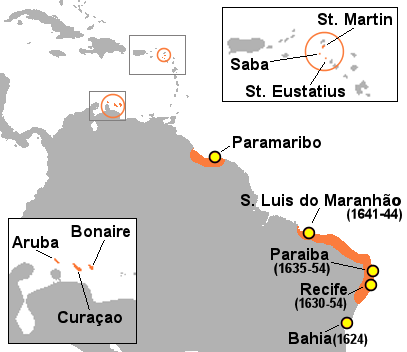
Dutch colonization of the Americas at the time

In the colonies located at the Americas (better occupied and institutionalized), the military tactics of the Anti-Habsburg coalition were mainly limited to supporting the privateering of their captains in the coastal zones of Ibero-America (mainly the Caribbean Sea), in order to drain the Spanish treasury and fill their own. The main exception were the attempts to occupy the Lesser Antilles, North America, Southern Chile, and specially Northeast Brazil, with some Indigenous help. The Dutch prince Maurice of Nassau believed that the ruin of Spain would be inevitable if any of its rich American colonies were taken from it, so in 1623-24 developed 2 big expeditions, one against the Viceroyalty of Peru and the other to Portuguese Brazil, the later with a bigger success.

=== Northeast Brazil ===
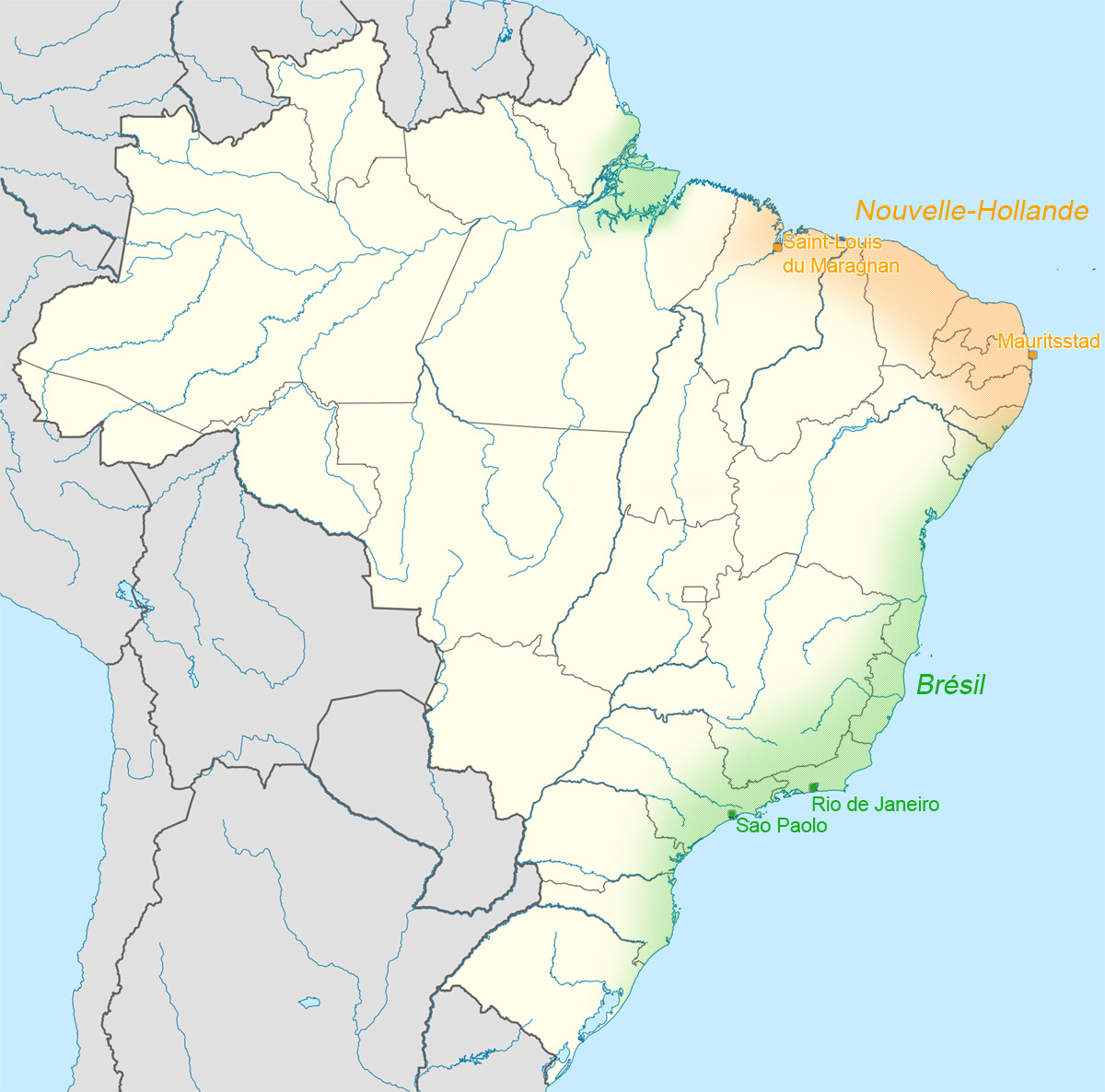
Map of Dutch and Portuguese struggles in Brazil

During the early phases of the Thirty Years' War, the Dutch West India Company targeted Portuguese Brazil, seizing Salvador da Bahia in 1624 and later capturing Pernambuco (1630), which was not returned until 1654. This led to the establishment of Dutch Brazil, being its capital Mauritsstad (modern Recife), and conquering more territory in the Campaign of Porto Calvo while also gaining some indigenous allies like the Tupi people and the Tarairiú. In consequence, Portuguese colonists, Mestiços (mainly related to Potiguara indigenous) and Afro-Brazilian militias mounted a Catholic resistance against the Dutch West India Company (despite John Maurice of Nassau's pragmatic tolerance, its pro-Jewish and pro-Protestant politics angered the Brazilian Catholic population that was economically harmed), while the Spanish Navy sent military aid in operations like the Jornada dos Vassalos, the Battle of Abrolhos, Siege of Salvador (1638), Battle of Pernambuco (1640), etc. in which arrived Castilian, Portuguese, and Neapolitan joint forces to aid Brazilians and secure Amazon River from foreign incursions that could menace Peruvian Amazonia. Although Portugal was formally part of the Habsburg monarchy at this time, these colonial losses damaged the supply networks of the Iberian Empire, while the Brazilian production (mainly sugar industry) financed much of the Dutch military budget during the 1630s and early 1640s.

After the State of Brazil recognised John IV of Braganza in 1641, succeeded local Austracistas intrigues from Brazilian nobility to restore the suzerainty to the Hispanic Monarchy (at least of Southern Brazil and Rio de Janeiro) in exchange of some privileges from the Governorate of the Río de la Plata in matter of supply of indigenous Guaraní workers, military defense against Dutch Brazil and autonomy. However the court of Madrid suspected in the intention of Bandeirantes in turning indigenous (under Castilian protection) into slaves and expel Spanish colonists from Río de la Plata, like have been done by luso-Brazilians in former Spanish Guayrá (cutting off Paraguay from its litoral in modern Paraná).

=== Southern Chile and Peru ===
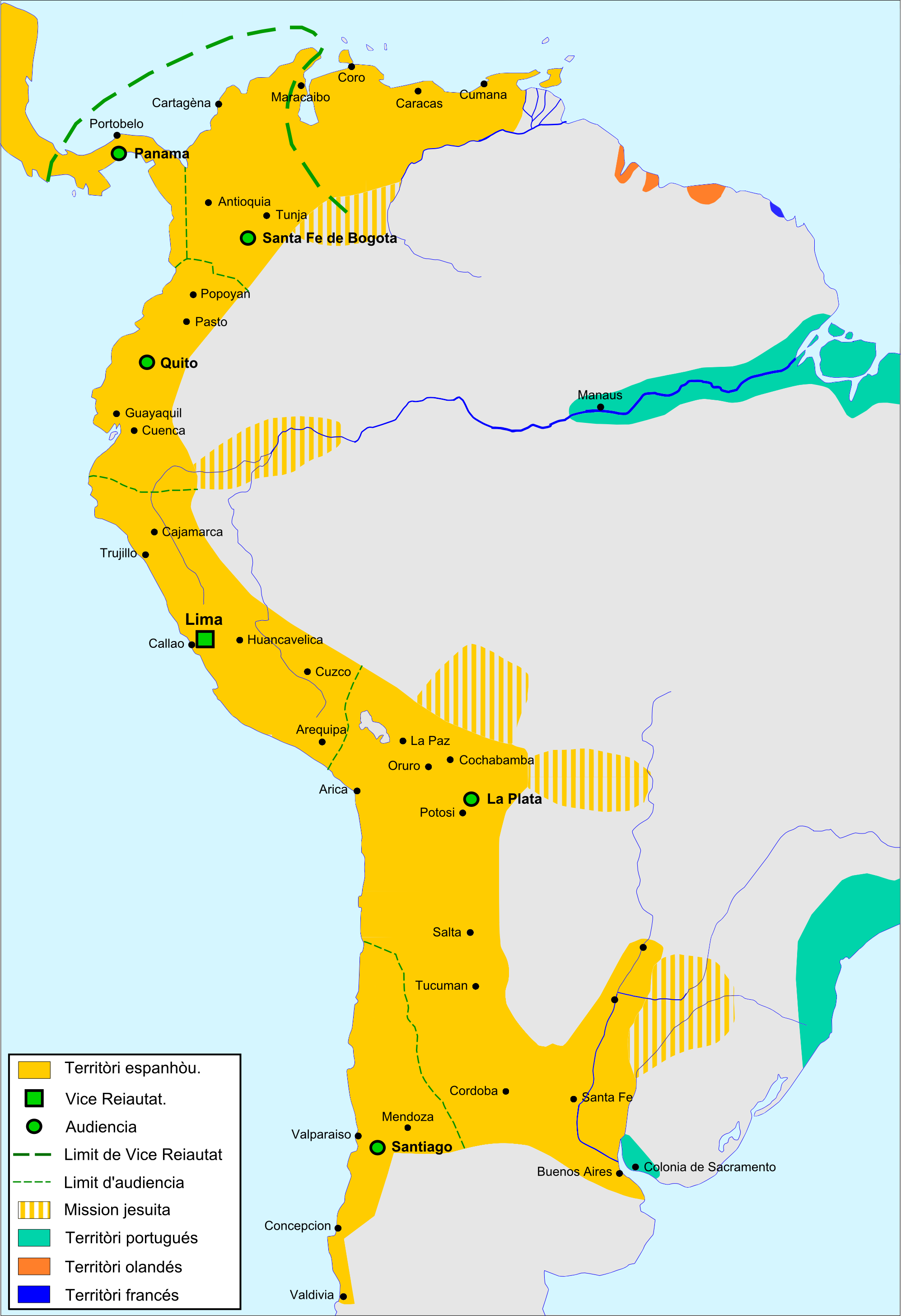
Viceroyalty of Peru territory at the time, including Callao and Valdivia locations

The Dutch prepared an expedition against the Viceroyalty of Peru, in which a Dutch conquest of Chile (or at least consolidate a base in Chiloé or the Magellans Strait) was considered as an imperative intermediate step to prepare for a larger invasion of Peru (the jewel of the Spanish crown in South America). Due to the destruction of the Seven Cities at the Arauco War in 1598, the Anti-Spanish coalition developed a special interest to conquer southern Chile, which had been deserted by Habsburg Spain after the Disaster of Curalaba and also was controlled by hostile Mapuches and Huilliches who could be potential allies against the Spaniards from the Captaincy General of Chile. Such special interest was increased by the Dutch after the Bombardment of Valparaiso (1614) by Joris van Spilbergen, since they knew firsthand the Spanish weakness in the region, and even defeated the Spaniards led by Rodrigo de Mendoza at Cañete (Peru), and then sack Paita (the goal of Spilbergen there was privateering than colonization).

With such goal in mind, an expedition of 11 navies with 2000 soldiers was launched in 1623 by Jacques l'Hermite (a French) from Amsterdam to Southern Pacific Ocean, reaching Mala (Peru) on May 5 of 1624 and then attacking Callao from May 9 by establishing a military blockade between San Lorenzo Island and La Punta to the mouth of the Rimac River (since the attempts to land in Callao and the attacks carried out on that port had not been successful). However, due to logistical problems and the Viceroy Diego Fernández de Córdoba's staunch resistance to preventing them from landing to resupply, the Dutch decided to withdraw in September 9 after the excessive number of deaths (including L'ermite) from famine and disease among the crew. The rest of the expedition, led now by Hugo Schapenham and Julius Wilhelm Van Verschoor, attacked Pisco, Acapulco and the Spanish East Indies until reaching Batavia.

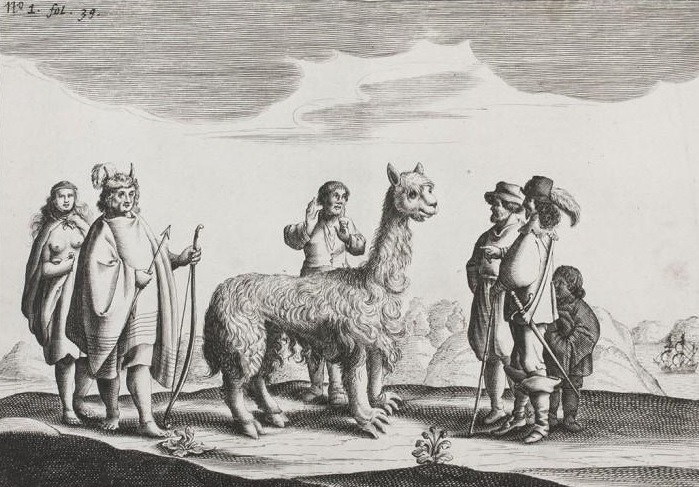
Hendrick Brouwer and Elías Herckmans at Valdivian forests, establishing alliances with Mapuche and Huilliche mounting their Chilihueque (Lama Araucanus)

Another attempt of the Dutch was done when John Maurice of Nassau sent in 1643 an expedition to Valdivia led by Hendrik Brouwer, who founded the colony of Brouwershaven in the ruins of Valparaíso, with the goal to conquer the Valdivia River valley. However, logistic problems made the Dutch colony inviable and were easily expelled.

=== Spanish Main and West Indies ===
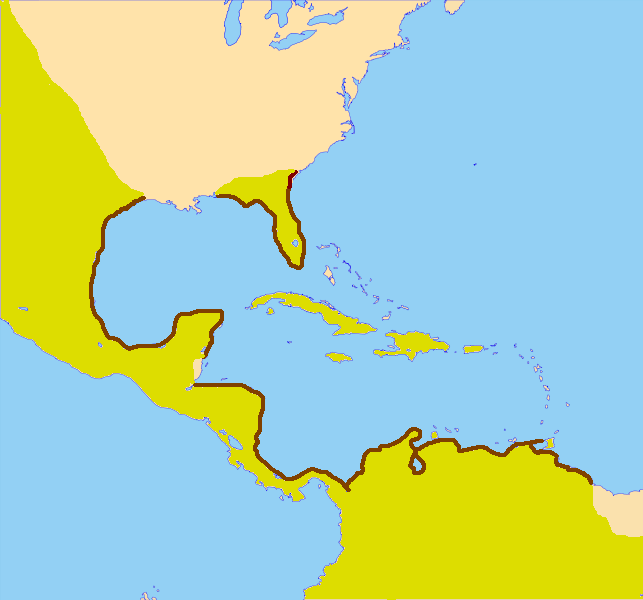
Spanish West Indies and Spanish Main

Multiple confrontations in the Caribbean—such as Dutch, English, and French raids on Spanish settlements between New Spain and New Granada—further weakened the Habsburg maritime system. These engagements contributed to the progressive erosion of Spain's Atlantic hegemony during the period, as Dutch, English and French privateers used the war to attack Spanish shipping under legal ambiguity. One of the most consequential overseas events was the 1628 capture of the Spanish treasure fleet by Dutch admiral Piet Pieterszoon Heyn in the bay of Matanzas (Cuba). The loss of American bullion was widely reported in German newspapers and perceived by contemporaries as having direct repercussions for Spanish military finance in Europe.

The Dutch West India Company succeeded in the Capture of Saint Martin (1633) and briefly occupied San Juan (Puerto Rico) in 1625, although most of the operations were focused in raid operations, like the Jan Janszoon van Hoorn's expedition of 1633 in Central America or the Expedition to the Unare in Venezuela. The English empire also take advantage of the Dutch-Spanish War by declaring war over Spain (the excuse was an English intervention to support Frederick V, son-in-law of James VI and I, against Habsburg Spain in the Palatinate campaign) to occupy strategic island and enclaves in the Caribbean like St. Kitts (in 1624, with the help of French), Barbados (in 1627), Nevis (in 1628), the Mosquito Coast of Nicaragua (in the 1630s), and modern Belize (in 1642). In the other hand, the Kingdom of France solidified its colonial presence in the Caribbean by colonizing Saint-Christophe in 1627, as also Martinique and Guadeloupe in 1635, both under Cardinal Richelieu, which were used as strategic naval and privateer bases to challenge Spanish monopolies and intercept trade routes in the Americas.

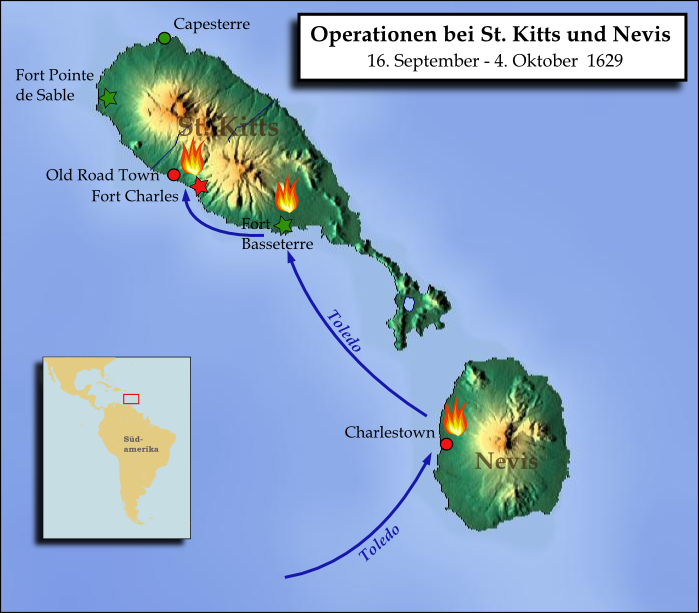
Map of Fadrique de Toledo's expedition to Saint Kitts and Nevis

However the Spaniards expelled English of St. Kitts in 1629 by taking advantage of Anglo-French struggles for the division of the island, and then the English failed in establishing a colony in Providencia (modern Colombia) after the Iberian capture of 1641. Also the French colonists tried to take advantage of the Anglo-Dutch-Iberian conflicts, but were not as successfully, settling in Tortuga on modern Haiti after the expulsion from St. Kitts in 1629 (desiring), but were expelled from there in 1635 by the Spaniards from Santo Domingo. Despite the military successes of the late 1620s and early 1630s, the Spaniards did not leave a permanent military garrison on Saint Kitts, Nevis or Tortuga, so the English and French returned later and intensified their colonization efforts in the Caribbean, focusing on the Bahamas and Saint-Domingue.

The Fogel Grip of the 1st Swedish expedition to North America in 1637-38, led by Peter Minuit and Måns Nilsson Kling, sacked some Spanish galleons near Saint Kitts to gain provisions. Also the Couronian colonizers at Tobago had some skirmishes with the colony of Spanish Trinidad (ally with local Kalinagos) during the late 1630s and early 1640s, until Cornelius Caroon consolidated a colony in 1643.

=== North America ===
The Anglo-French War (1627–1629) is analyzed by modern Historiography not as an isolated civil or bilateral conflict, but as a critical sub-theater of the broader Thirty Years' War (1618–1648), as the Duke of Buckingham's expedition to La Rochelle was born strictly from the breakdown of the Anglo-French alliance of 1624 (an alliance explicitly designed to counter the Habsburgs in Germany, as the English intervention was inextricably tied to counter the Spanish-Habsburg grand strategy), in which the English army intervened to aid the Huguenot rebels. After such breakdown, Spain and France signed a temporal secret alliance in 1626 (consequence of the brief Peace of Monzon) to counter England and the Protestants. The consequence in Oversea was the invasion of New France by English forces from Newfoundland Colony (led by David Kirke), which ended in an English victory and an Occupied Quebec, although later was restored the French colonial suzerainty of Canada through diplomatic negotiations.

In the other hand, after the breakdown of the Franco-Spanish alliance, it was developed in Spanish America an Economic warfare by Spain against the catholic foreign traders allied to France (as a consequence of their war since 1635), in which their propierties were confiscated through military force in order to dismantle their commercial networks with local encomenderos in the Latin American markets. Specially, in New Spain, the colonial authorities started a policy of arrest, distress, and deportation of French merchants that were stablished in Puebla and Mexico City, heavily disrupting French commercial networks tied to America and seizing French mercantile goods worth over 300,000 pesos.

== Africa ==
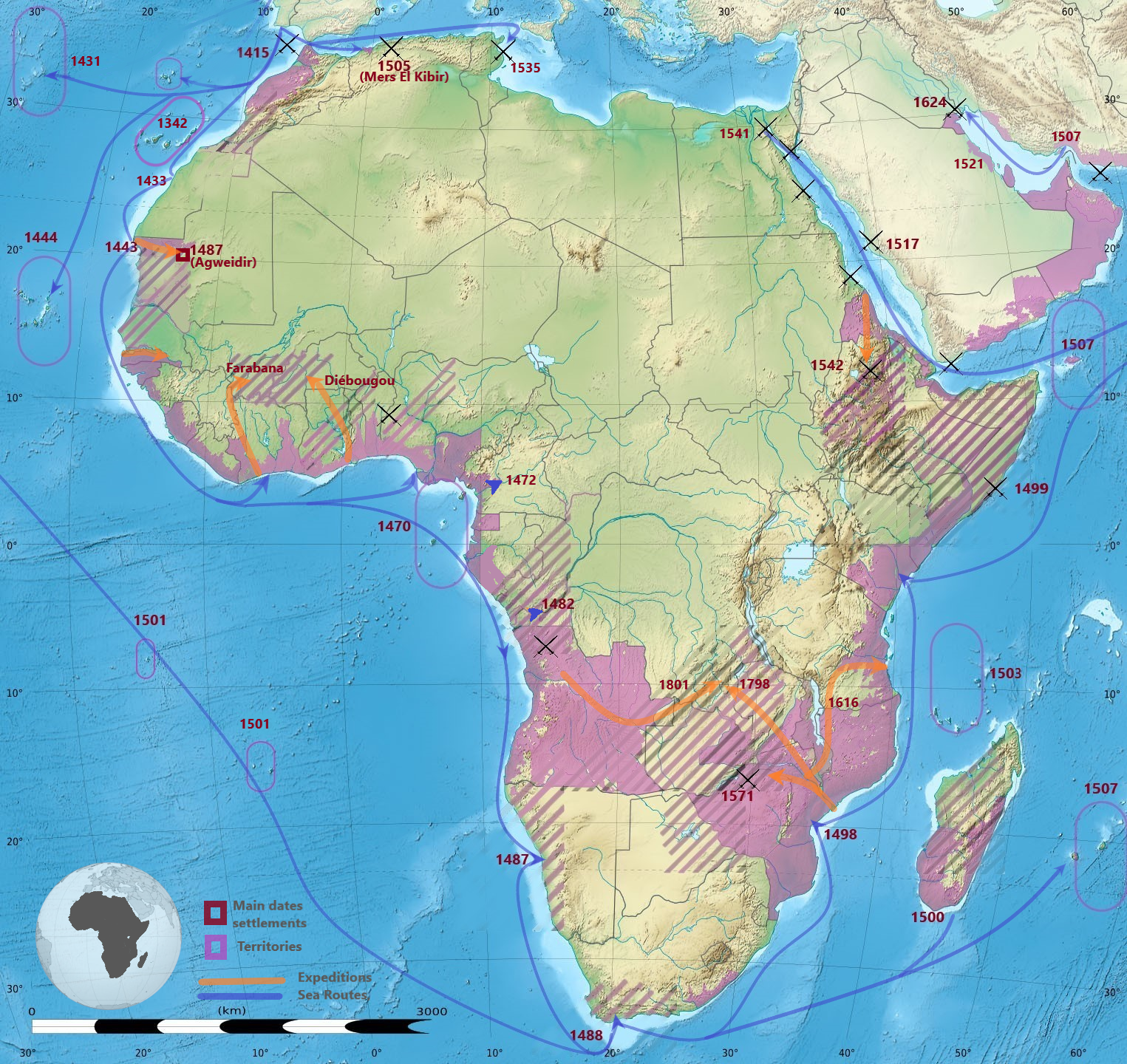
Portuguese Empire in Africa

In Africa, there were mostly Anglo-Dutch raids against Portuguese Africans bases in the coasts and islands of the continent, while also some skirmishes between the Iberians versus the Ottomans and Danish-Norwegian (allies of the Anti-Habsburg Coalition). Portuguese São Tomé and Príncipe and Portuguese Cape Verde suffered most of those raids by privateers. However, the Dutch West India Company developed bigger plans to conquer the Slave Coast of West Africa and Portuguese Angola to control the Transatlantic Slave Trade.

=== North Africa ===
North Africa became an important region for Habsburg Spain and Protestant Anti-Habsburgs from the early 1600s, since the Expulsion of the Moriscos (as the Moriscos became refugees and corsairs across the Maghreb) and the arrival of Anglo-Dutch corsairs (interested to attack the Iberian Peninsula during Eighty Years' War), being a Northern Invasion for the local Berbers. On 1610s was conquered Larache and Medhya as Plazas de soberanía (under Duke of Medina Sidonia captaincy and Mercedarian patronage) to counter the Anglo-Dutch raids and for a possible conquest of Morocco and Algeria. Despite, at the renewal of Flanders campaign during the 1620s, the Castilian interest in the Mediterranean and Africa was marginalized in preference of North Sea and Northern Europe, being the Portuguese the ones focused in the region due to their economical interests in the Near East, although a lot of renegades from Ottoman Africa offered their services of spionage to the Iberian Union. Simultaneously, the Ottoman Empire (from the Barbary Coast) and Venice were interested in supporting the Barbary corsairs from Morocco to challenge the Iberian sphere of influence in the Mediterranean.

Iberian Union possessions in North Africa

Saadi Sultanate at early 1600s

On early years of the 1625–1630 Anglo-Spanish War, Charles I of England sent diplomatic missions to Morocco (at the time in Civil War) to involucrate them in the Thirty Years' War and join the Anti-Habsburg Spain coalition, although the Cádiz expedition (1625) convince Moroccans to do not accept the offer, while their current situation of anarchy since the death of Ahmed al-Mansur in 1603 made imprudent to enter in conflict with the Spanish Empire (which was a mediator between different warlords). Despite, the mujahideen and Hornachero warlord Sidi Al-Ayyashi (head of state of the Republic of Salé, in rebellion against pro-Spanish Saadi Sultans) in May 9 of 1627 accepted an offer of English alliance for 10 years, in which they used Anglo-Turkish piracy tactics, tried to capture Spanish Mehdya in 1628 and fortified Salé in 1637. Then, the Moroccan ambassador Jawdar ben Abdellah reached another alliance with England in 1637 to support Mohammed esh-Sheikh (allied with France and with Netherlands) against other Moroccan claimants and Marabouts (someones backed by the Iberian Union Habsburgs, like the Saadi of Marrakesh or the Moriscos in Salé).

During the Portuguese Restoration War, Tangier and Ceuta make allegiance to Habsburg Spain and rejected John IV of Braganza attempts to be recognised. However, a 1643 Braganzist Rebellion in Tangier forced such colony to secede from the Hispanic Monarchy and be annexed by the reconstituted Portuguese Monarchy, while Ceuta until today is a Spanish territory (despite some Portuguese conspiracies in 1641). This loyalty from Portuguese plazas at Morocco was influenced by their dependences in subsidies from Andalusia and attempted negotiations from Braganzist Junta of Portugal to abandon those to Saadi Sultanate in exchange of Moroccan support in the European conflict (John IV and Cardinal Richelieu in 1640-42 tried to convince Moroccans to invade Spain and instigate an Andalusian rebellion like the Catalonian one). During those years, the Plazas de soberanía were occasionally raided by Muslim warlords or the Anti-Habsburg allies, taking advantage of logistical problems. Other minor confrontations involved some skirmishes at the Canary Islands in which the Spaniards tried to increased the regulations over the entrancy of English, Dutch, French, Ottoman, Moroccan, German, Swedish or Danish navies (like the 1640 Christianshavn Incident), avoiding them to raid those for piracy or use the islands as a scale to reach the West or East Indies and so sabotage their colonialist projects, fearing an occupation than turn the islands into bases (like briefly did Pieter van der Does in 1599). At the end, it was a pyrrhic victory for Spain by maintaining its control in the Strait of Gibraltar (avoiding the creation of an English or Dutch colony against Spain) and not losing territories (even gaining enclaves in North Africa) at the cost of being severely damaged the Mediterranean fleet (starting with 75 vessels in 1619 to 26 vessels in 1648) and having supply problems.

=== West Africa ===
The struggle for control of West African (mainly the ports in the Gold Coast, modern Ghana) affected the Atlantic slave trade, which was economically vital for the economy of Habsburg Portugal. The disruption of these routes undermined Portuguese Brazil and thereby the Portuguese segment of the Spanish Habsburg world monarchy, indirectly constraining funds available for the Habsburg land war in Germany. Although the Portuguese initially won the 1618 English expedition to the Gambia and the Battle of Elmina (1625), the Dutch gains at the Battle of Elmina (1637) and the Battle of Axim (1642) collapsed the Portuguese Gold Coast and strengthened both the Dutch West India Company (creating the colony of Dutch Gold Coast to connect with Dutch Brazil slavers) and the Dutch Republic state treasury, something heavily needed for their War in Flanders. Simultaneously succeeded a corsair war in the region between Portuguese and Dutch, this ones allied with Lançados settlers and privateers of Sephardic origin that were renegades of the Iberian Union.

=== Central Africa ===
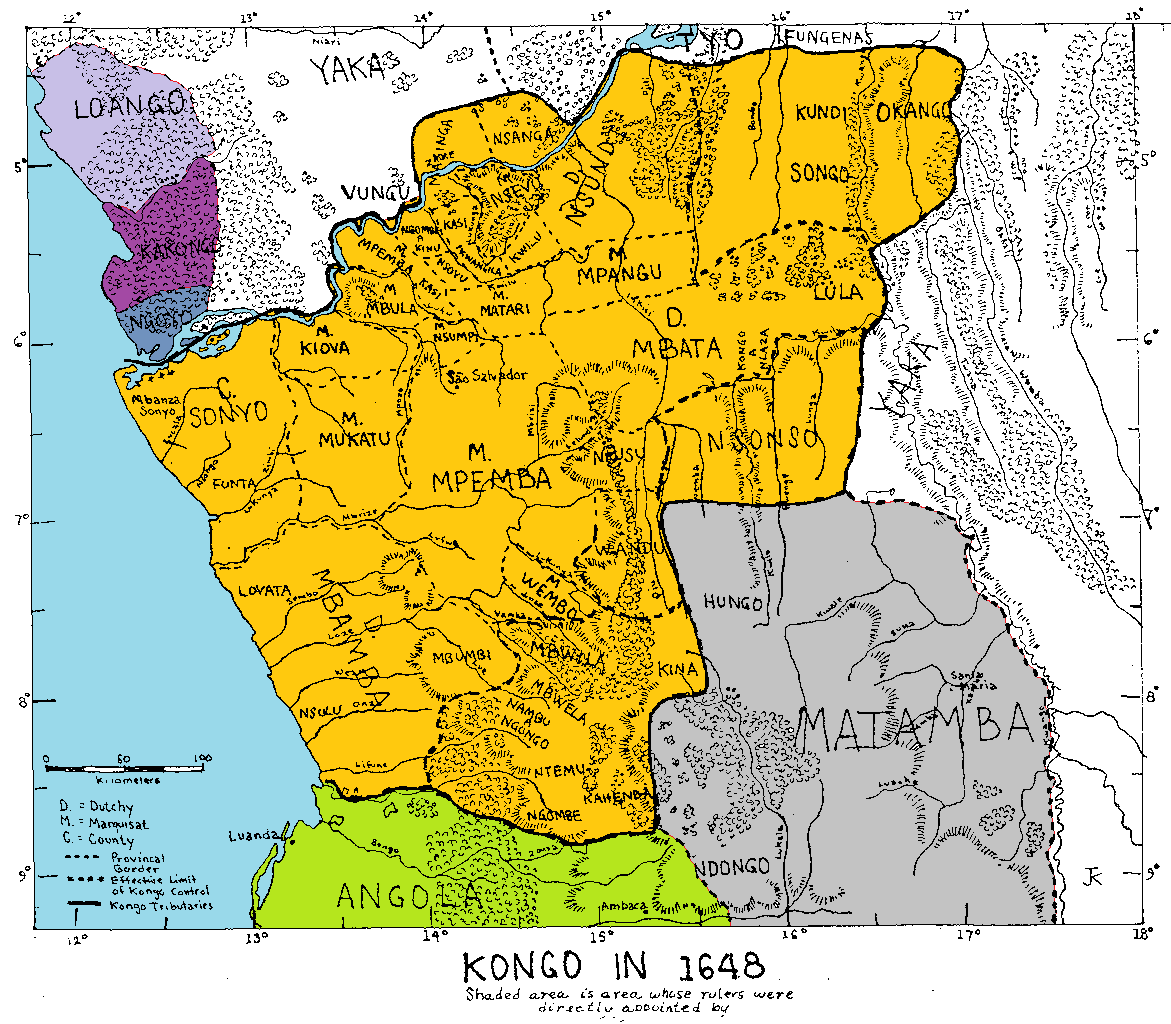
Map of Kongo and neighbour states.

Map of Portuguese Angola

Since 1511, the Kingdom of Kongo developed a pact of confederation with the Portuguese Empire, which turned Kongo into a military objective for the enemies of Portugal (being raided by the Dutch initially). The early colony of Portuguese Angola depended a lot in alliances with local rulers at the east of Luanda (mainly the Kingdom of Ndongo) to reach the Hinterland and benefit of the trade of the Congo Basin. Discovering this Portuguese dependency in local rulers after the news of Kongo victory at 1623 Battle of Mbanda Kasi (a revenge over Portuguese incursions at Mbumbi), the Dutch developed an Anti-Portuguese alliance between them, Kingdom of Ndongo and the Kingdom of Loango to expel the Portuguese from the region and stablish a Dutch colony there. Also influenced in Dutch intervention that Castilians were banned by Kingdom of Portugal to intervene in Aethiopia (Africa south of Canary Islands) according to the Tordesillas treaty and Cortes of Tomar that were Fundamental laws of the Iberian Union.

Initially, the Dutch failed in 1624 during the invasions of Filips van Zuylen and Piet Hein to aid Pedro II of Kongo's Angolan Wars (although the Dutch suffered treason by Garcia I of Kongo), focusing then on consolidate the Dutch conquest of Brazil and raid the Spanish Main before other African empress. Despite, the Dutch's luck changed in 1641 when they seized Portuguese slave trading hubs in Angola and São Tomé (after Capture of Luanda) with support from Dutch Brazil and the local kingdoms of Kongo led by Garcia II of Kongo (who restored the Dutch-Kongo alliance to rebel against Daniel da Silva) and Ndongo led by Queen Nzinga (whose position was threatened by Portuguese expansion), the last one being the mastermind behind the largest anti-colonial alliance of Angolan states (between Matamba, Ndongo and Kasanje, then the chiefdoms of Quiassama, Dembos and Congo Basin). The Portuguese now faced attacks from the Ndongo from the east, the Kongo from the north, the Dutch from the west coming by sea, and the Quiassama tribes from the south in the corridor between the Cuanza and Bengo rivers, concluding in the Battle of Kombi. However, the Portuguese recover the initiative after getting reinforcement from Portuguese Brazilians while also achieving a peace agreement and alliances with locals like the kingdom of Kasanje (which, aside the Portuguese control of Caconda and Massangano, prived the Dutch to reach the Hinterland and buy slaves to African lords), getting the Portuguese to recapture Angola at 1648.

=== East Africa ===
East Africa was an important region for Portuguese Empire due to being a necessary step to reach Indian Ocean and for the Ottomans was relevant to protect the Bab el-Mandeb Strait and impede Iberians to reach Red Sea. Despite the small intervention of the Ottomans in the Thirty Years' War in Eastern Europe, they were tacitly allied to the Protestant Anti-Habsburg Coalition and sought to help the Dutch Empire and the French in the name of their alliance, as also the formal state of Spanish-Ottoman war since 1515 and to oppose the Habsburg–Persian alliance.

Also there was a brief Spanish-Ottoman proxy conflict in the Ethiopian Empire during the 1630s, in which the attempts of the Iberian-backed Jesuits to convert Ethiopians from Ethiopian Orthodox to Coptic Catholics through the pro-Iberian Susenyos I caused a Coptic Oriental Orthodox reaction led by the Anti-Catholic Fasilides (with help of Ottoman Habesh and other neighbour Islamic sultanates), who won a war of succession in 1632. At the end, the Catholic Patriarch, Afonso Mendes, and the Jesuits were banned and their properties confiscated in 1634. Mendes tried to convince Philip IV of Spain until 1638 to launch an invasion of Ethiopia to end the persecution of Catholics in Abyssinia, but that solicitation was rejected due to the resistance of Portuguese Goa to co-operate with Spaniards, as also the fear of open another war front for Habsburg Spain at the Thirty Years' War or to ruin the Holy See–Spain relations due to the increase of Franciscan anti-Jesuitism.

=== South Africa ===
At the time, the region of Southern Africa was under the Portuguese sphere of influence, specially through their factory at Cape of Good Hope to secure the travel between Atlantic and Indian Ocean. In consequence, the Anti-Habsburg Protestant coalition tried to disrupt the Iberian reinforcements and shipping between Europe and Asia through attacks on Portuguese shipping around the Cape. The Dutch East India Company since the early 1600s made constant raids against the Iberian navies in the region to interrupt the Carreira da Índia route and to secure their own travel routes to the Eastern Hemisphere, and when the Twelve Years' Truce ended, the newly formed Dutch West India Company joined to those raids to consolidate their own participation in the Atlantic slave trade.

== Asia and Oceania ==
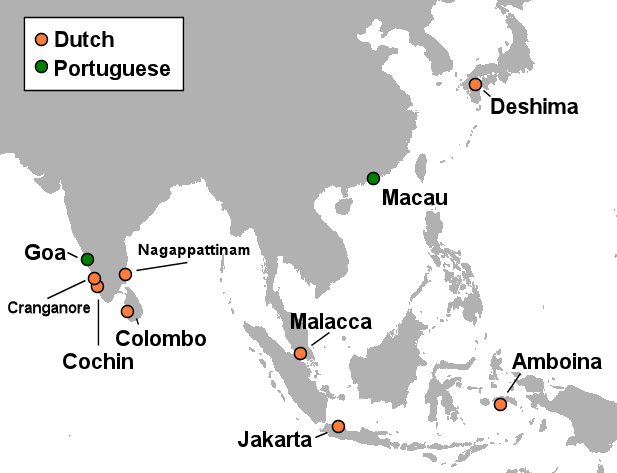
Main bases of the Dutch East Indies in the Far East

In Asia and Oceania, the Dutch East India Company, through the main bases in Surat (in India) and Batavia (in Java), and the English East India Company in lesser extent, fought the Portuguese Estado da Índia and the Spanish Captaincy General of Philippines for dominance over Indonesian and Indian Ocean spice routes. Battles were fought for rich colonies across a vast area such as Macau, the East Indies, Sri Lanka, Formosa (Taiwan), the Philippines, among others, in which notable confrontations included the struggles over Portuguese Malacca and Portuguese Ceylon. Although geographically distant, these victories increased Dutch commercial profits through piracy in Asia and weakened the Portuguese Crown at a time when Portugal's resources were tied to Habsburg war aims. This also perjudicated the Portuguese economy (who suffered an increase in taxes to compensate the colonial losses) and influenced in the causes of the Portuguese Restoration War. The importance of this Eastern Hemisphere theater was that the Anti-Habsburg coalition, led by the Anglo-Dutch, wanted to put an end to the Iberian's Mare clausum based in Tordesillas treaty's Papal concessions for an exclusive Portuguese sphere of influence in the Indo-Pacific, which was used to exclude other European Powers to participate in a free maritime trade. Iberians justified this in Anti-Protestantism by securing Catholic monopoly in Asian people's conversion to Christianity. However, due to the Spanish-Portuguese rivalry, despite the uneasy partnership, this campaigns became the most difficult for the Spanish Habsburgs in matter of logistics, and the most fragile politically for the Iberian Union. A great flaw of Portuguese military in the East was that the eastern Indian Ocean (Gulf of Bengal, Malay archipelago and South China Sea) was under a minimum control from Portuguese India authorities, depending a lot in private initiatives, and also maintaining an inner rivalry with Spanish Philippines.

=== Persian Gulf ===
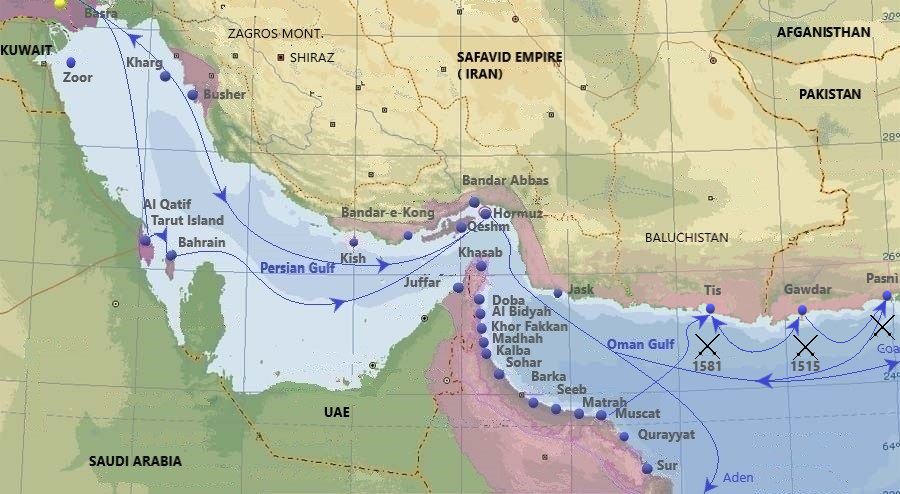
Main bases of the Portuguese in the Persian Gulf

Since the 16th century, the Portuguese dominated the Persian Gulf, initially to secure positions to attack Basra Eyalet at the Ottoman–Portuguese confrontations, but then to control trade between Safavid Iran and Omani Empire with Eurasia and convert Middle Easterners to Roman Catholicism. The English East India Company, though less directly involved in the continental conflict, contributed to the general pressure on Portuguese trade networks through competition in Surat, the Persian Gulf, and Southeast Asia. This led to English intrigues against Portuguese presence in Asia, which would cause the 1621-1625 "Crisis of Hormuz" in the Iberian Union after the successes of the English East India Company to expel Portuguese from Qeshm and Hormuz Island in exchange of developing commercial Iran–England relations with the Safavids. All of this events were a reaction to Ruy Freire de Andrade's 1619 preventive attack (at the Baloch–Portuguese conflicts against Piracy in the Persian Gulf) in Qeshm to expel the English through a reckless tactic of crossing Safavid coastal lands to encircle the English while briefly closing maritime communications between Iran and the Strait of Hormuz (violating Safavid sovereignty to do so). However, the plan would only succeed if the English naval presence in the Persian Gulf was annihilated, preventing them from seeking an alliance with the angered Safavids (who lacked of an Iranian navy and would be forced to accept the Portuguese terms to restore their territories) for a certain revenge that actually happened in the Anglo-Persian capture of Qeshm and of Hormuz in 1621–22, in which the survivor English ships transported the Iranian land army to restore their Suzerainty in Qeshm and then expel the Portuguese from Southern Iran at 1625. The Portuguese in vengeance started to support Ottoman Iraq against Safavid Iraq at the Ottoman–Persian War (1623–1639), sending their armada to the 1624 Siege of Baghdad (being rewarded with a factory), and also developed an alliance with the Imamate of Oman in the other side of Persian Gulf to counter Abbas the Great's expansionism.

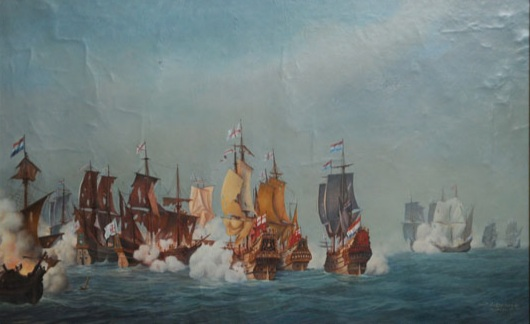
Battle off Hormuz (1625) between Anglo-Dutch and Iberian Union forces

Despite that the Council of Portugal desired the formation of a Castilian-Portuguese joint force to retake Ormuz and declare war over Iran, the Hispanic Monarchy in the Junta of Persia priorized a diplomatic approach, not wanting to harm the Habsburg–Persian alliance (necessary for the balance of power in the Indo-Mediterranean against the Ottoman Caliphate), which angered the Portuguese, who ignored the deplorable state of the finances of Portugal and Castile (and so, the logistical difficulty to defy the naval and economic power of the North European merchant companies, as well as the military power of the local great powers like Abbas the Great's Iran), which were the arguments offered by the Council of Castile in avoiding to start a war with the Anglo-Iranians that would isolate more the Habsburgs in a critical situation like the Thirty Years' War. In the other hand, although the English monarchy was not originally involved and initially George Villiers considered to demand the EIC for threatening Ibero-English relations (as there was not a formal declaration of war yet due to the English doubts about whether to intervene in the Thirty Years' War or not and do the Spanish match against Franco-Dutch alliance), he and King James I were bribed with 10,000 pounds to get Diplomatic protection and support in establishing a monopoly over Persian silk trade on the Cape route (originally offered by the Shah to Spain, although Spaniards were not interested), which soured relations between both monarchies for such conspiracy against Iberian monopoly, leading to the political tensions of 1625 and then the English intervention in the Eighty Years' War by the approachment between the Crown and the House of Commons (dominated in the 1624 4th Parliament of King James I by EIC traders and Protestants hostiles to Iberians). The next engagement was the Battle off Hormuz (1625) in which Portuguese stabilized their control over the Persian Gulf and reached a truce with Safavids but with heavy costs and without being capable to impede the arrival of non-Portuguese European merchants from the EIC and the VOC since 1629. Also the Dutch take advantage of the English victories among the Safavid dynasty (who preferred the Protestants over Catholics due to not having pretentions of evangelisation nor spreach their Western culture, only wanting to trade) by developing trade agreements and establishing their own factories in the region.

=== India and Sri Lanka ===
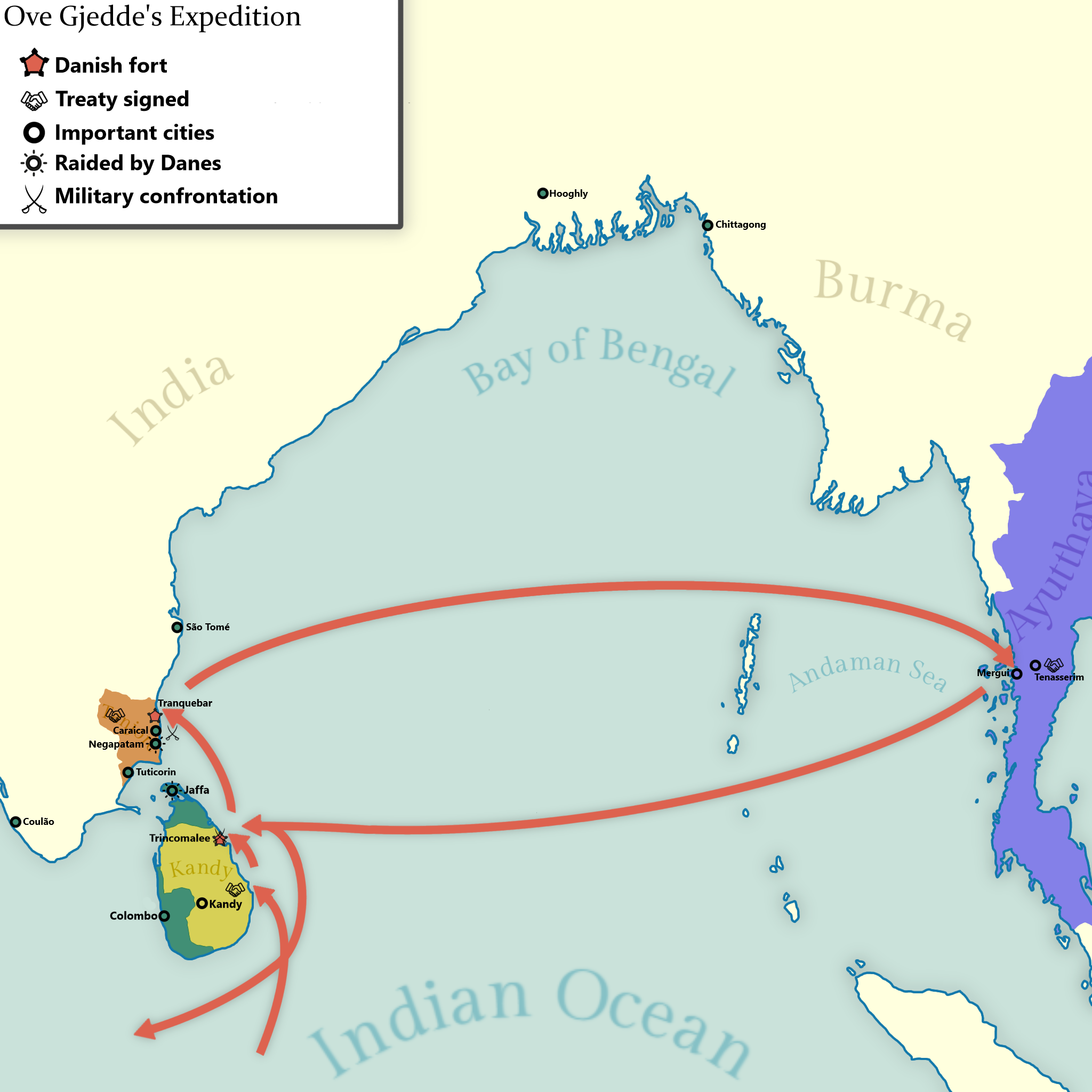
Ove Gjedde's Expedition in South Asia.

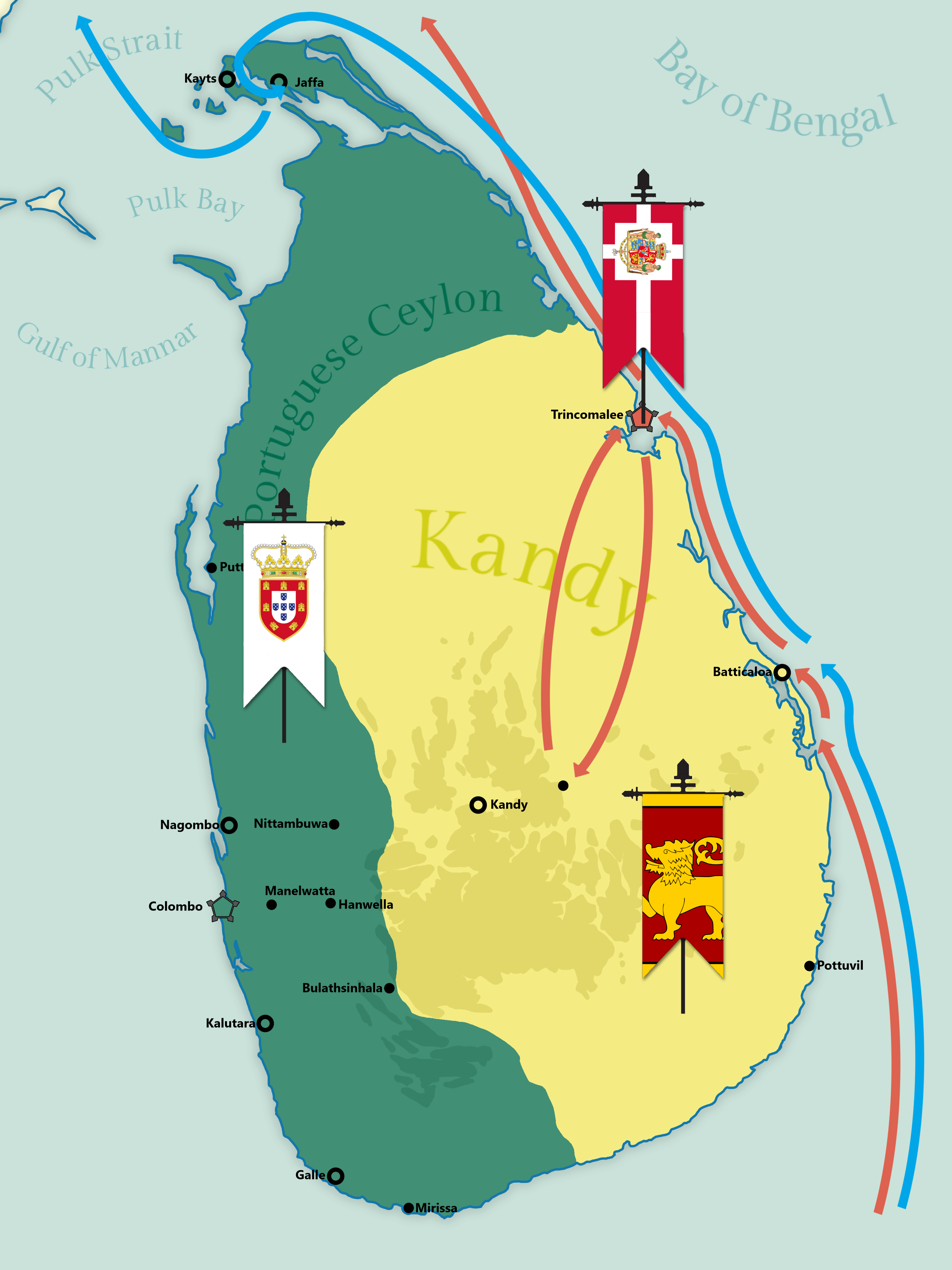
Sri Lanka at the Thirty Years' War and the clash between Portuguese Ceylon and Danish India.

Since the arrival of the Portuguese presence at Sri Lanka in 1518, there was an intermittent conflict in which the local powers (like Jaffna, Kandy, among others) clashed with Portuguese Ceylon, who take advantage of the rivalries and animosities among the Sinhalese kingdoms. Eventually, European Powers hostile to Habsburgs arrived in the region and tried to stablish alliances and agreements with those Anti-Portuguese locals at early 1600s, mainly Dutch during the Eighty Years' War. However, after the Portuguese conquest of the Jaffna kingdom, the Lusitan hegemony was consolidated by the late 1610s. So, the Kingdom of Kandy sought help from the VOC and briefly from the Danish East India Company (ally of Dutch) at the 1618-22 Ove Gjedde's Expedition.

The Raja of Kandy, Senarath Adahasin, convinced Crappé to declare war against the Portuguese in 1619, which lead to a military campaign at the Coromandel Coast (mainly Karaikal) and Northern Sri Lanka (mainly Jaffna) that also involucrated the Thanjavur Nayak kingdom in the side of Dano-Dutch Protestants (in which was erected Fort Dansborg after the Tranquebar Treaty of 1620 with Raghunatha Nayak, which gave birth to Danish India). Although the Danish offensive was a failure, the Portuguese launched a new campaign in 1622 to get rid of them definitively from Trincomalee, in which another consequence was the destruction of the Hindu Koneswaram Temple (occupied by Danes since May 1620).

Despite the Danish defeat, the Kandyans defeated Portugal at Randeniwela (in which many pro-Portuguese natives revolted) and at Gannoruwa. Then Rajasinha II in 1635–38 made an alliance with Adam Westerwolt that would conclude in the Siege of Galle (1640), in which Dutch Ceylon was formed and Portuguese influence declined in the region (leading to the end of the Dutch-Kandyan alliance, as the Sinhalese people did not want other colonialism). In the same years, on the Indian subcontinent, Iberian-Protestant clashes happened, like the 1621–23 Anglo-Dutch raids in Western India. Adam Westerwolt would launch a blockade of Goa which would culminate in the battles of Battle of Goa (1638) and the Battle of Mormugão (1639); the latter would result in his death. Although the VOC succeeded in conducting piracy raids against Portuguese India and even periodically blockaded Goa from 1603 to 1644 (preventing large merchant ships from leaving Goa for Lisbon, or sending military aid to Malacca or Ceylon), the Dutch failed to conquer the jewel of Portuguese presence in Asia despite having help from local powers like the Sultanate of Bijapur. However, the Dutch Bengal had other successes by blocking trade between Portuguese factories on the Malabar Coast and those in Ming China, isolating Goa from Macau by the late 1620s.

At the end, the Dutch captured the Portuguese settlements in Galle, Trincomalee, Batticaloa, Negombo and Colombo in Sri Lanka; and the Portuguese factories in Thoothukudi, Negapattinam, Kollam, Kodungallur, Kannur and Kochi in India. In the other hand, after the Ormuz and Ceylon defeats (losing cinnamon's monopoly), the Estado da India entered in a political crisis (hiding the defeats against the Anglo-Dutch, fearing the crowds and inner fights), generating complaints in Portugal against the corruption and vices of the arrogant Fidalgo authorities at Goa (obsessed in militarism and intimidation to preserve monopoly than diplomatic approach and economic concessions to some enemies for peace) and their rejection to let Castilians to intervene through the Union of Arms or to open trade with the EIC or VOC (proposed by Castile to reach a good peace to preserve the remnant territories in the East), causing the Spaniards to accuse them of demanding everything from Spanish Empire without offering anything to resolve their crisis due to their disloyalty and incapability of reforming the "drain" that Portuguese Asia represented, increasing the inner tensions in the Iberian Union that lead to Portuguese Independence. Brief solutions were the Luso-English truce of 1634 at Surat (consequence of the 1630 Peace of Madrid) and the establishment of the Portuguese East India Company to let non-Portuguese capitals (ally of Habsburgs) participate in Goa and extract more benefits from India, but the lack of support from private business and Luso-Asians merchants, as also Anti-Jewish laws and Fuero regulations, led to its downfall. A 1640 proposal to open free trade between Portuguese India and the rest of the Spanish Empire to save the Iberian-Asian commerce was rejected by the Luso-Indians authorities and was a reason for them to support the Forty Conspirators and acclaim the Braganzas in September 9 of 1641 (changing side in the Thirty Years' War).

=== East Indies ===
The most complex theater of the war was the one involving the East Indies, as it was the one with the most profitable benefits due to the Spice islands and Chinese trade. After the 1606 conquest of the Moluccas and occupation of Fort Kastela, the Spaniards became key players in the East Indies (zone of interest by the Dutch and Portuguese) and during the Twelve Years' Truce reinforced their position in 1609 by building Fort Tahula and Fort Manado for active confrontation against the Dutch, something which happened during the rule of Juan de Silva in Spanish Philippines in 1611, as the Dutch occupied Fort Oranje and Fort Tolukko (renaming it Fort Hollandia) to fight against Spain, allied to the Sultanate of Tidore (who let Spain to do a settlement called Ciudad del Rosario, in return preserved their traditional leaders and ethnic Mardica identity). However, this theater of war officially started when the VOC conquered Jakarta in 1619 against the Sultanate of Mataram, making it their base in the east and forming the Dutch East Indies. Through Batavia (Dutch East Indies), the Dutch launched big offensives against the Portuguese India at Malacca, even establishing new colonies like Dutch Formosa that menaced Portuguese Macau and the Spanish Captaincy General of the Philippines at Manila, which received help from New Spain and Peru in terms of economic resources and Indian auxiliary forces, as also was very important the recruitment of Indigenous peoples of Philippines and of Indonesia in the Spanish army (being prominent the Pampangos, Cagayanos, Tidores) as also Japanese (mainly Kirishitans) and Chinese Filipino volunteers. Also the Dutch made alliances with local Austronesians like Johor, Aceh, Ternate and Moro peoples. Minor allies were the Ottomans and Safavids by sending economic support to the VOC-Muslim allies.

Aside of Brazil, the East Indies theater (specially during the rules of Miguel de Noronha at Goa and Juan Niño de Tabora at Manila) was the only front of the War in which Spaniards and Portuguese had a degree of military cooperation at the South Seas from Malacca strait to Philippine Sea, instead of having purely separate strategies against the Protestant Anti-Habsburg forces in the zone (mainly Dutch, English, French and Danish-Norwegian, whose ironically were more united than the Iberians). The Portuguese Goa authorities cooperated reluctantly and constantly hesitated to obey Council of Portugal requisites (trying to reinforce their supremacy over the royal court in the Eastern affairs) while the Portuguese Macau tried to integrate more with the Spanish East Indies (as the China–Spain route through Manila galleon was more secure and profitable than the insecure and decadent China–Portugal route through Portuguese India Armadas).

==== On the Portuguese side ====
There were 2 main fronts, on the Indonesian Archipelago and the Malay Peninsula:

- Strait of Malacca: This theater (located at the Malay Peninsula and Sumatra) was the most important due to the rivalry between Portuguese Malacca and Dutch Batavia (both capitals) for the control of the East Indies, in which another factor was that such region connected the Indian Ocean and the Pacific Ocean. Previously, the governor of Philippines, Juan de Silva, sent an expedition to aid Portuguese at the Singapore Strait in 1616, but bad climate and a Portuguese defeat by Dutch-Johor forces (before joining the Spanish forces) ruined the Java enterprise, although the VOC also could not domain Singapore in the next years. During 1623–1627 happened a lot of Anglo-Dutch attempts to conquer Malacca, but those failed and then the Anglo-Dutch changed their strategy in doing constant raids and a blockade of Malacca led by Cornelis Symonz to disrupt communications with Mainland Southeast Asia (and so, with Goa and Macau), leading to the 1630 Battle of Jambi. Those raids were accompanied by the Battle of Langat River and of Duyon River by the Acehnese allies (although they were defeated and entered in crisis). This raids and blockades harmed terrible the colonial economy and ruined their logistics for defenses, in which the consequence was the 1641 Siege of Malacca when the VOC finally defeated Portuguese and stablished the colony of Dutch Malacca, causing a terrible psychological humiliation for the Portuguese. Being legally the 1641 Battle of Malacca the last significative military engagement of the Iberian Union in Portuguese Asia (before arriving notices about the Portuguese Independence War in September 1641), such defeat influenced in the decision of Portuguese Indonesians to accept John IV of Braganza and reject Habsburg Spain, hoping the end of Protestant Anti-Habsburg raids from the Thirty Years' War.
- Portuguese Indonesia: After Solor island was lost in 1613, the colonial government of Portuguese Indonesia (eastern to Portuguese Malacca) moved to Flores island, which started to be raided by the Dutch East Indies' navy. In 1646, the Insulindia capital moved to Kupang at Western Timor and developed a Captaincy general, although very weak but serving as the seed for the development of Portuguese Timor colony.

==== On the Spanish side ====
There were 3 main fronts, on Taiwan, Philippines and northern Indonesia:

Spanish East Indies in the Maluku Islands.

Spanish and Dutch Formosa zones.

- Northern Maluku-Minahasa Peninsula: By 1618, Spanish East Indies occupied Tidore, southern Ternate, northern Sulawesi (in which evangelisated the allied Manado Kingdom, who sent supplies) and some parts of Halmahera and of Morotai, while the Dutch East Indies had inestability due to rebellions in Makian, Siau, Ambon and the Banda (in which also had clashes with the English, like in Amboyna), but also had more economic benefits than the Spaniards under deficit and suffering Dutch naval blockades, becoming the riskiest and most costly territory for the Spaniards (needing fortified and large vessels to avoid attacks and get supply). When the Thirty Years' War started, French and Danish were in Sulawesi by 1620–21, so Alonso Fajardo de Tenza sent constantly relief fleets to aid the Spanish Moluccas and stablished alliances with Makassar while abandoning costly positions like the forts in Jailolo and Manado. In reaction, the Dutch strengthen their alliance with the Sultanate of Ternate (rivals of Tidore and rebellious to Iberians) to invade those forts and launch raids through Kora kora ships against Iberian galleons, while receiving aid from the corsairs Van Verschoor and Schapenham (previously raided Peru in 1624). The Spaniards answered by occupying Fort Marieko in 1621 (abandoned by the Dutch), then Fort Kalamata in 1625 while raiding Dutch Celebes and receiving aid from Madrid. The death of Saidi Berkat (exiled Ternatean Sultan in Manila) in 1628 ruined a plan of peaceful reconquest to expel the Dutch that were in a precarious position by not receiving reinforcements from the Netherlands. Juan Niño de Tabora sent a fleet that was defeated by the VOC in the 1627 Battle of Ternate, but Pedro de Heredia triumphed in a revenge at 1628 and in 1629. During 1630s-40s, the use of larger ships favoured Spaniards to overcome Dutch raids and intervene to aid Cachil Varo against pro-Dutch Cachil Borotalo in a Tidore's succession war (in which the Dutch win), as also the king of Manados against rebels (who expelled Spanish Friars). More clashes succeeded in Fort Oranje (mostly with Spanish victory, despite Dutch receiving help from Jailolo and Maguindanao Sultanate) until 1651 when arrived the news about the Peace of Westphalia. Although the Spaniards triumphed over the Dutch raids, it was a pyrrhic victory as Hamza of Ternate expanded its territory and rejected Vassalage while the Spanish costs to secure their territories from Dutch Malacca made it economically inviable, abandoning Maluku at 1656–1662 after Koxinga's menace of war and the betrayal of Tidore (remaining only Kingdom of Siau as protectorate until 1677).
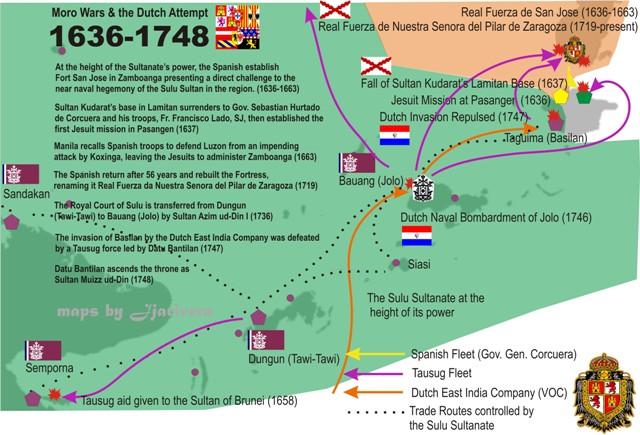
- Dutch intervention in the Spanish–Moro conflict
  Spanish Philippines: Since the early 1600s the Philippines were raided by the Dutch Empire, being the most important confrontation (before ending Twelve Years' Truce) the 1617 Battle of Playa Honda. Then, the Anglo-Dutch ships, aided by Sino-Japanese Wokou and Moro pirates, constantly blockaded Manila since the 1620s and harmed the communications of Manila with the rest of the Iberian Union (although the Spanish Philippines defeated Dutch invasions in La Naval de Manila and Puerto de Cavite battles at late 1640s). Simultaneously, the VOC with Ternate tried to develop an Anti-Catholic coalition with local Muslim powers (like Sulu, Maguindanao, Lanao) to expel the Spaniards from the Malay Archipelago, causing a VOC intervention (from Dutch Makassar) in the Spanish–Moro conflict located in Southern Philippines, leading to the Spanish campaigns in Lanao (1637–1639), in which the Spaniards had aid from Indigenous Filipinos, Siau, Ternatean Christians, New Spain, Santo Domingo and Peru (mainly Tlaxcaltecs and Quechuas, but also Mestizo and Criollo convicts) to put an end to Moro pirates. At the end the Catholic alliance won and led to the 1638-46 Spanish occupation of Jolo, but the unification of Mindanao Muslims succeeded in expel the Spaniards with Dutch help in the long term. The effects of the military efforts in the Pacific Ocean put an end to the Captaincy General of the Philippines' expansionist plans in Southeast Asia, abandoning the Spaniards their sphere of influence in Borneo and Maluku while retreating from Sulu Archipelago, focusing instead in professionalize military the Filipinos and do improvements in the administration and economy of the colonies that Spain already had.
- Formosa: In 1624, Dutch Formosa was stablished in modern Tainan to control the Taiwan Strait to reach Ming China and also damaging the Philippines–Taiwan route to harm the Captaincy General of the Philippines' commerce and security (also to aid Wokous in the Sino-Dutch conflicts). In reaction, the Spaniards settled in Cape Santiago in 1626 and started to colonize northern Taiwan in Quelang to reinforce the China–Philippines route and the Japan–Spain relations menaced critically by the Dutch interference. The Spanish Formosa was colonized by Spanish Filipinos aided by Kapampangan, Ibanag and Ilocano people, who served in the colonial troops. The presence of the Spanish in the north and the Dutch in the south brought the rivalry between the two powers to the region. The Spanish were successful in repelling the first Dutch naval attack in 1630, organized by Pieter Nuyts. However, the Dutch and Sino-Japanese pirates managed to prevent annual supply ships (sent from Manila) from delivering provisions, which caused the Spanish on the island to venture inland in search of supplies, which led in 1636 to an uprising by the indigenous people of the Tamsui area that destroyed the Spanish fortification, killing 30 of its 60 defenders, but it was later rebuilt. Then, the next significate clash was the 1641 Battle of San Salvador with Spanish victory, but 1642 Battle of San Salvador ended the Spanish influence in Taiwan and consolidated the one of the Dutch, while also indirectly of the Han Taiwanese (as the Southern Ming refugees settled in Taiwan to resist the Manchu conquest of China, leading to a Chinese colonization of Taiwan), which were already clashing with the Dutch at Liaoluo Bay since the 1630s.

=== China ===
Since the early 1600s, Dutch and English forces reached Ming China trying to stablish China–Netherlands and China–England economical relationships (although failed due to Portuguese protests and the Dutch alliance with Wokou pirates that caused Sino-Dutch conflicts), and by 1623 to 1636 the Portuguese lost 500 navies at colonial Macau due to their raids and aggressions, which included a blockade of Macau and Manila by an Anglo-Dutch navy commanded by Willem Janszoon. These Anglo-Dutch attacks caused an increase of collaboration between Portuguese Macau and the Captaincy General of the Philippines, integrating Macau to the Manila galleon route and occasionally receiving Castilian auxiliary forces and supplies (although being cautious, because Spaniards were potential competitors for being pro-Fujianese traders and wanting to have their own factory in mainland China). One of the most important raids was the 1622 Battle of Macau, in which the VOC tried to conquer Macau to force China to open its market to them (and ruin the Iberian economical circuit between Manila, Malacca and Goa), but the Spanish-Portuguese forces succeeded.

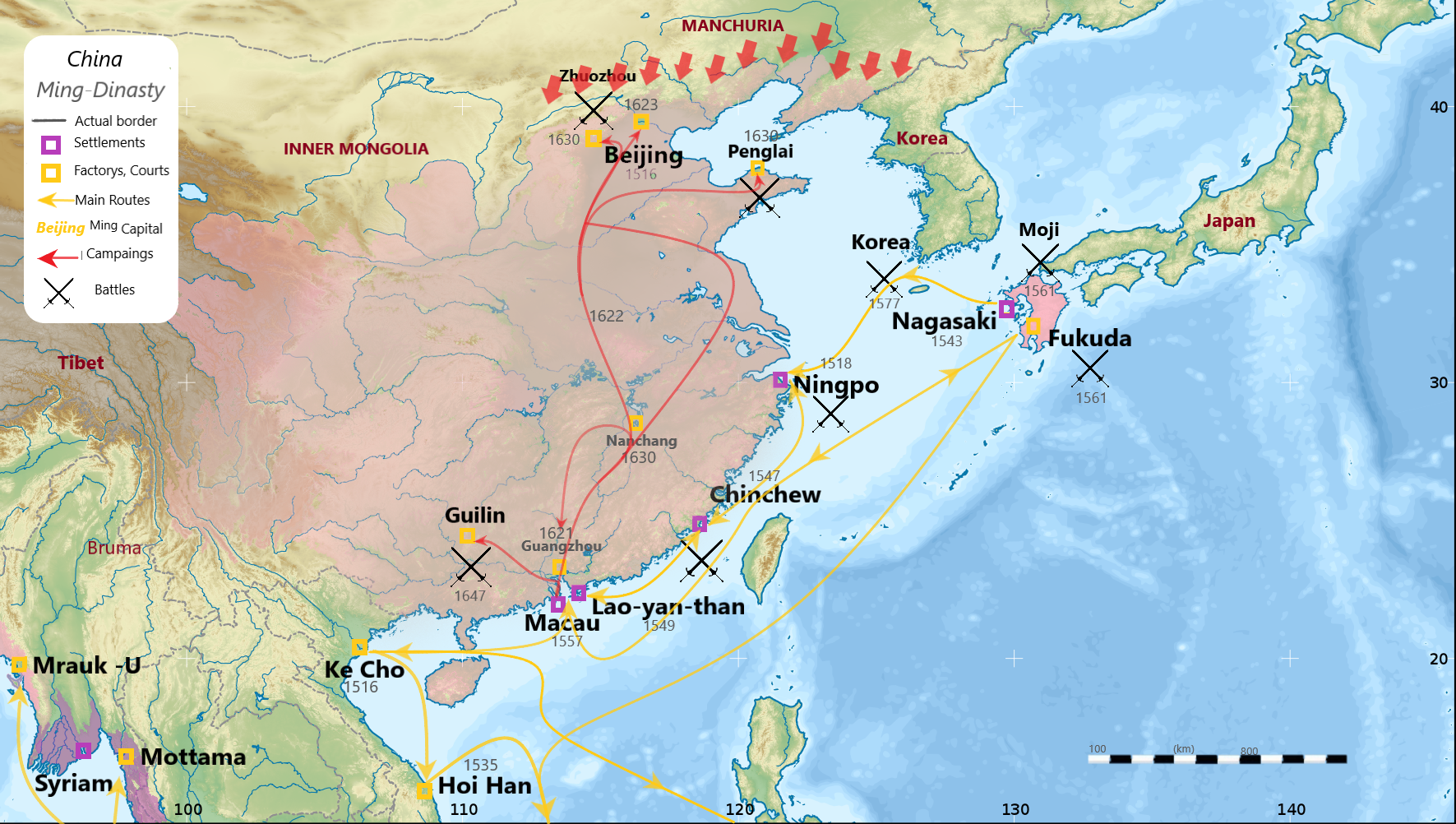
Portuguese presence in East Asia.

Simultaneously at the South China Sea started a series of Sino-Dutch conflicts, which were a consequence of Dutch attempts to force Ming China to close his commerce with Portuguese Macau and Spanish Philippines, demanding to open free trade with the Dutch and the rest of Europe. This led to an informal alliance between Mings and Iberians (who wanted to maintain their economical privileges), while the angered Dutch allied with Asian pirates. Some important Sino-Dutch skirmishes were the Battle of Liaoluo Bay. An indirect consequence of this struggles were that the Imperial Chinese authorities give permission for Portuguese Macau to fortify itself and improve its walls (something banned in the 16th century to avoid possible Iberian conquest of China) to defend Southern China from Wokou pirates backed by the Dutch.

Despite Macau triumphed in securing its military defense through the war despite being one of the weakest Portuguese colony in the region, such was a pyrrhic victory as Macau ended in economical ruin around the 1640s due to the ruin of Goa-Macau Indian trade, the Macau-New Spain trade (because Portuguese Independence) and the Macau-Japan trade (because Sakoku isolationism) caused by the consequences of Dutch expansionism and Spanish crisis at the Thirty Years' War. Also Macau situation worsened by the contemporary Ming-Qing Conflict (in which Macau supported their Ming allies against the Manchu Qing invasion, involving in the 1640 Siege of Galle). All of this concluded in the 1640-42 Macau political crisis due to the doubts in colonial authorities to recognise John IV of Braganza (maintaining their privileges and autonomy at the cost of using the more dangerous Cape Route) or maintain allegiance to Philip IV of Spain (maintaining the more secure Philippines-Mexico-Spain route at the cost of being more dependent of the Hispanic Monarchy); a Macau proposal of 1642 in which a Castilian-Filipino Presidio should be stablished in their city (to defend them from Anglo-Dutch and Sino-Japanese pirates) and free mobilization for Macau people to Manila was briefly considered as a compromise to maintain the Spanish Habsburg Suzerainty, but the Cortes in Madrid rejected it due to the previous confiscation of property against Spaniards that did Macau authorities. After that, Macau joined the Anti-Habsburg coalition and the Anglo-Dutch navies began to supply them and act as intermediaries, although in 1644 and 1646 some Spanish Filipinos instigated an Austracist revolts to re-annex Macau to Spain, but failed and the Portuguese punishment was the total expulsion of Spaniards merchants and missionaries from Portuguese India.

=== Proxy conflicts ===
There were another conflicts in which there was an indirect participation of a European Power backing a Local Power (without sending their colonial forces) against another European Power which was in opposing sides at the time of the Thirty Years' War:

- Map of Danish India settlements. The Dano-Mughal War in the Bay of Bengal was affected by the Dano-Swedish War at the Thirty Years' War.
  In India: The effects of the Torstenson War (1643–45) had influence over the Danish East India Company, as the defeated Danish Navy could not dispatch new ships to Tranquebar for approximately 3 decades, making Danish India a de facto independent society that depended of their own funds to its defense. Also, during the Dano-Mughal War, due to the Swedish-Dutch alliance in reaction to a Dano-Spanish alliance to limit their commerce in the Øresund, the properties of the Danish-Norwegian factories in the Bay of Bengal increasingly felt under Dutch Bengal control (who became allies of the Mughal Empire as part of the Dutch support in the Swedish war against Denmark-Norway for briefly joining the Imperial side in 1643–45) and after the Peace of Brömsebro, tolls for Dutch ships were significantly reduced in Danish India. Another Dano-Dutch conflict at the time was the Siege of Dansborg (1644) by the Dutch-backed Thanjavur Nayak kingdom, a consequence of the Dano-Carical Conflict against a Dutch-Portuguese brief alliance. Also a minor conflict was the Danish civil war between Willem Leyel and Bernt Pessart, which involved the parties of the Thirty Years' War.
- In Bengal: There was the Burmese–Portuguese and Mughal–Portuguese conflicts (which increased due to Portuguese menaces of war against locals if they did not expel Anglo-Dutch merchants) in which the Dutch sent some aid to local powers hostile to Portuguese, like in the Siege of Hooghly. Also there were struggles in Hooghly between Mughal and Anglo-Dutch traders about the economical rights granted by the Farmans to Europpeans (who desired to receive monopolies than free-trade zones), which the Portuguese take advantage by associating with local Arakan traders and factions in the Mughal Court. In the end, the Portuguese factory at Sandwip Island became the center of Portuguese influence in the Bengal region after the fall of Portuguese settlement in Chittagong, while loss support from the Royal power in Lisbon due to its informal economic nature.
- In Indochina: There were 3 main conflicts:
  - Spanish-Siam War (1624–1636): Fernándo de Silva, Governor-General of the Philippines, ordained a fleet to sack a Dutch ship near the coasts of Thailand. This enraged King Songtham of Ayutthaya Siam (the Dutch had his favor) and declared war on the Spanish East Indies and Portuguese India.
  - Trịnh–Nguyễn War: A war between Nguyễn lords (backed by Portuguese) and Trịnh lords (backed by Dutch and French) for the control of Vietnam. The VOC was defeated at the Battle of the Gianh River (1643), leading to the Nguyễn victory afterward and the expulsion of Papal representant, Alexandre de Rhodes, from Trịnh court.
  - Cambodian–Dutch War (1643–1644): Conflict instigated by the Portuguese (who had the favor of the Cambodian King Ramathipadi I) against the Dutch East India Company.

== Results ==
=== For the Anti-Habsburg Protestant Coalition ===
- Although the Dutch gains in the West proved short-lived (as they would lose Dutch Brazil and Dutch Loango-Angola), the Dutch retained territories in the East, like the Cape Colony, as well as Portuguese trading posts on the Gold Coast, in Malacca, on the Malabar Coast, the Moluccas and Ceylon. This led to the Dutch Golden Age and the consolidation of the VOC as the most profiable company of the world at the time. Also a minor gain would be the Anglo-Dutch hegemony in the Caribbean Sea through their possessions in the West Indies, becoming the roots of the sugar and slave societies that will be established in the region by them (and other colonial powers), as also of the Golden Age of Piracy.
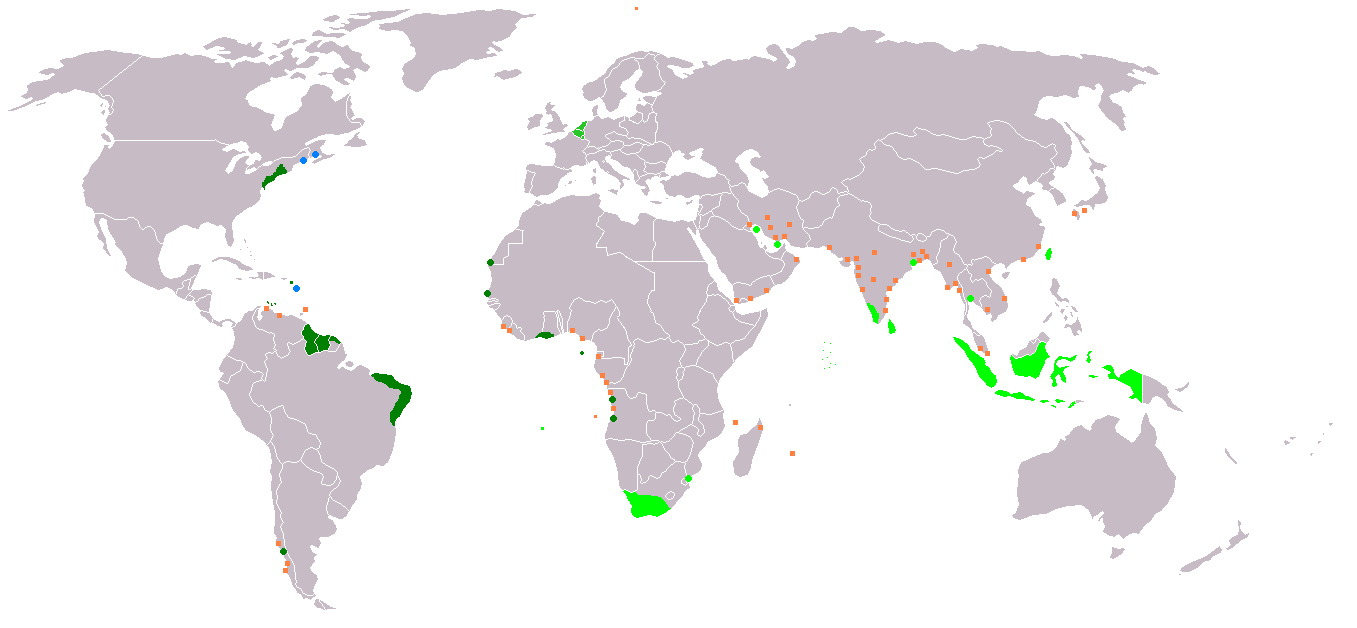
  Rise of the Dutch Empire
- By the 1620s, the English consolidated colonies in Virginia, New England and some Caribbean islands in the Lesser Antilles that the Spaniards did not settle. Although initially the English West Indies were conceived as bases for Anti-Spanish contraband and privateering, then those would become in plantation societies through forced settlement (and others into Pirate Republics). In the other hand, the English North America would start to be colonized in mass by thousands of Puritans who departed for the New World in the 1630s, and once the colonial population had stabilized, England developed a systematic colonial policy since the 1640s.
- Also would be increased the inner struggles between the anti-Iberian allies after the end of their interventions in the Thirty Years' War, like the Anglo-French rivalry (that will led to a Conflict in Quebec at the Anglo-French War (1627–1629) and then the French and Indian Wars between New France and British America), the Dutch-Swedish War at the Northern War of 1655–1660 (which led to the fall of New Sweden) and the Anglo-Dutch wars (which led to the fall of New Netherland).
- The consolidation of the VOC and the East India Company would lead them to impose humiliating unequal treaties to the Portuguese India in exchange of giving support to Portuguese Independence (opening these colonies to Anglo-Dutch imports at levels unthinkable for the local elites during the Pax Hispanica) as well as the cession of Bombay and Tangier to the English (generating a political crisis in Goa against the Anglophiles of Lisbon, in which the possibility of recognizing Charles II of Spain was briefly considered.). Also to the development of a corporate political economy that will transcend national political and economic frameworks, overwhelming the nation state interests (consolidating thalassocratic and corporatocratic geopolitics over continental and monarchical in both societies) and increasing the early globalization (developing commercial, capital, and communication networks which would integrate institutions and philosophies across Afro-Eurasia) in mercantilist parameters and Protestant ethic, instead of the Catholic ethics and missionary parameters from the Iberian Empire, leading to the development of Modern philosophy in world economy and International law in such proto-liberal direction than scholasticism. An indirect consequence of this power accumulated by the colonial Chartered companies would be the empowerment of the Parliamentary sovereignty (dominated by the oversea bourgeoisie with such capitalist-Protestant spirit) against The Crown institutions, so a rejection of Absolutist rule and the Catholic faith in English philosophy that would lead to the English Revolution.
- The lessest winner of the alliance was the French colonial empire. In the Americas, the Compagnie des Iles de l'Amerique ended in bankruptcy at early 1650s, selling most of their possessions in the West Indies to the Knights of Malta, who did their own Hospitaller colonization.

=== For the Pro-Habsburg Iberian Alliance ===
- Politically, the big losses for Portugal in its Empire in the East infuriated the local elites to develop Anti-Spanish sentiments that were taken advantage of by Cardinal Richelieu, becoming one of the reasons for the Portuguese Restoration War (a proxy war from the Thirty Years' War), as the Council of Portugal questioned how Spanish rule could be justified if the king could not protect them from their commercial rivals. This led to Portugal changing sides in favour of the Anti-Habsburg Coalition, formalizing the Treaty of The Hague (1641) in which Portugal and Dutch became allies in Europe (although in colonies the conflict would remain, rarely joining forces against common enemies). Another consecuence was the renewal of Spanish-Portuguese colonial wars between Portuguese Brazil (mainly Bandeirantes and Tupi people) and Spanish Peru (mainly Jesuit missions among the Guaraní) in the Río de la Plata Basin, leading to the Battle of Mbororé (1641).

Iberian Union colonial empire in the Far East at the end of Thirty Years' War

- Although the Dutch–Portuguese War continued until 1663 (15 years after Peace of Westphalia), the Portuguese presence in Asia was already collapsing in 1648 due to Portuguese India being a military target of the Anti-Habsburg Spain coalition (even after Portuguese Independence). The revenues of Portuguese India in the 1630s were inadequate to meet its basic defense against English, Dutch and Nordic incursions, while declined the volume of shipping between Lisbon and Goa to near half of the 1500s. Essentially the Dutch colonialists crushed the Portuguese shipping (capturing more than 500 cargo ships between 1623 and 1638) and humiliated Portuguese Colonialists by expelling them from Ghana, Sri Lanka, Bengal and Indonesia while blockading Portuguese Armadas in the Indian Ocean and occupying the Portuguese jewels in the Western Hemisphere (Brazil and Angola, important for the Atlantic slave trade). By the 1660s, the age of Portuguese hegemony in South Asia ended while other European powers rise like Danish, Dutch, French and British India. This decline lead to the adoption of desperate but immoral measures like supporting piracy in India to harm Anglo-Dutch and the end of politics about intermarriages between Luso-Asians to punish Indigenous traitors.
- Both Iberian Empires decreased their Crusader ideology and renounced to develop ambitious expansionist plans of conquest in the Far East unlike in the 16th and early 17th centuries. So, both developed a shift towards the Atlantic in terms of their geopolitical power projection, in which the regions of Spanish America and the Portuguese Brazil with Angola became the new priorities for Spanish-Portuguese imperialism, instead of the former Carreira da Índias approach focused in the Spice islands. Also this was influenced by the criticism towards Portuguese Padroado among Holy See due to the resentment developed by non-Portuguese Catholics (like the pro-Spanish Franciscans and Dominicans, or pro-French clergy) to the pro-Portuguese Jesuits in monopoly to Evangelisate Asia. In the case of Portuguese civilization was developed an Atlantic and Lusotropical conception of their society, strenghenting the relations of Luso-Africans with Luso-Brazilians and their cultural and economic connections, in which the king of Portugal was not only a "Lusitanian" monarch, but also "Indian, Brazilian, and African". However, the Atlantic shift generated discontents among the Portuguese colonies in Asia, viewing the coup d'état carried out by the Braganzas as one that did not consider their own interests.
- In both Portuguese India and Spanish America were developed military reforms, in which Goa, Cuba, Puerto Rico, Cartagena, Chiloé, Valdivia and Callao strengthened defensive works due to fear of Dutch–English cooperation. In the case of Spain, warships from the European fleet had to be sent to America constantly to push the piracy in the Caribbean, while Castile's demography and taxation capacity fall apart due to the tax system reaching its limits and being constantly under military recruitment and levies to defend Spanish Empire across the world. Another series of reforms were done in the Mining industry to overcome the Spanish bankruptcy, and bigger protectionist policies in the Viceroyalty of Peru against English, Dutch and French merchants (specially if those were Protestants) that were usually very related with the Corsairs that menaced the defense of the Pacific Ocean.
- Despite the 1648 Peace of Westphalia, the Dutch will continue to raid Spanish Philippines and support conspiracies from local powers hostile to Spain (like Ternate, Maguindanao, Sulu, Wokou and Moro pirates, etc.) until the early 18th century, obligating Spain to maintain a costly fleet in the region despite the big economical losses, being considered the withdrawal of Spain from its East Indies due to the debts and deficit (but prevented by the missionary objectives of converting indigenous people, more important to the monarchs than the economic objectives). Another issue was the lost of the Encomienda over Portuguese Indonesia after the Portuguese Independence, which harmed the viability of the Spanish Moluccas colony (which would be abandoned in the late 1660s).

=== For the Indigenous and colonial populations ===
- The fall of Portuguese Kingdom of Hormuz led to the increase of Omani–Portuguese conflicts, as the Portuguese Empire in the East moved from Bandar Abbas to Portuguese Oman in the other side of the Persian Gulf. Those Portuguese-Omani clashes (which were contemporary to Thirty Years' War) involucrated the Capture of Julfar, the Siege of Sohar (1633–1643) and Dobhia (1647) just a few decades later. In the long term, Omani Ya'rubids challenged Portuguese supremacy on the east African coast until ending it at early 18th century, founding the Omani Empire.
- Decline of Portuguese India led to a more competition between European colonies in India, which in the shorth term contributed with the rise of Shah Jahan's Mughal culture and trade with Europe, in a long term to the decline of the Mughal Empire and other local powes in Indian subcontinent through intercolonial warfare and conspiracies. Most of those new colonial rulers would be worse than the former Portuguese (who succeeded in establish aflinity between themselves and the locals, developing Luso-Asian Mestiço culture and voluntary integration of Goan Catholics and other Luso-Indians Assimilados), like the Dutch through their practices to superimpose their language on the indigenous peoples in the East by penal enactments. Another outcome was the decadence of Portuguese language as Lingua franca in regions like Bengal, and the decline of Christian missionary zeal due to Protestant work ethic more phocused in Commerce than in evangelisation like Catholic ethics among expelled Jesuits.
- An indirect consequence was the decadence of Eastern Catholicism in the Eastern Hemisphere, as the Protestant colonial empires (helped by local Pagan allies and Muslims) launched a successful campaign of desprestigee against the Iberian-backed Jesuit Asia missions (like the ones in Safavid Iran, in China, etc.) as also the ban of Catholic Church in India, Sri Lanka, Indonesia, Japan, Ethiopia, etc. in the short-term. In the long-term also contributed in the lack of success of Christianity in Asia and in Africa to develop massive religious conversion unlike Christianity in the Americas. Also such campaign of desprestigee contributed in the consolidation of Anti-Portuguese stereotypes and Black Legend among the historiography of Portuguese presence in Asia in the Netherlands and Indonesia.
- The consolidation of Dutch colonies in former Portuguese territories with significative Roman Catholic and Luso-speaking population (like Dutch Malacca, Dutch Ceylon, Dutch Loango-Angola, Dutch Brazil, etc.) provocated active religious discrimination policies to privilege the Dutch Reformed Church (like tolerating Catholicism only in private) and do a cultural genocide against the local Lusosphere (not only against ethnic Portuguese but also against Mestiço and Assimilado local peoples). This provocated an exodus of Luso-Asians, Portuguese Africans and Brazilians to territories still under control of Portuguese Empire.
- The consolidation of Dutch Formosa led to anti-indigenous Taiwanese policies like the Dutch pacification campaign on Formosa and the promotion of large-scale Han immigration to the island for cheap labour. This indirectly generated a clash with Southern Ming led by Koxinga's Kingdom of Tungning, in which the Dutch would be finally expelled as a final consequence of the Sino-Dutch conflicts, in which the local Austronesian peoples would enter into a new colonization led by Han Taiwanese. Similar anti-indigenous policy was accomplished in the Dutch East Indies, which lead to the Dutch–Mataram conflicts in Indonesia.
- The consolidation of Protestant colonial societies in North America (on the modern U.S. East Coast and Quebec) led to an increase of mortality among Native Americans in the United States and the First Nations in Canada due to the American Indian Wars and the European alliances with indigenous great powers (like Iroquois Confederacy). The first ones being the Anglo-Powhatan Wars, Pequot War, Beaver Wars and the Kieft's War which were contemporary to the Thirty Years' War. As the Anglo-Dutch imperial ideology did not see relevant to argue about their king's jurisdiction over native populations and their personal rights (unlike Spaniards with the Laws of the Indies and intellectual work like De debellandis indis), they would develop ethnic cleansing and forced displacement to the natives in the name of right of conquest.
- The Filipino people suffered an increase in taxation (like the bandala tribute in fruits) to pay the Spanish war efforts against the Anglo-Dutch and Wokou raids, which led to a big anger among them and generated seeds for further Philippine revolts against Spain, like the 1649 Sumuroy Revolt or the 1660 Maniago/Pampanga Revolt. Despite, Sabiniano Manrique de Lara rule from 1653 to 1663 succeeded in apaciguate the local tensions by priorizing in compensate the debts that Spain had with the indigenous peoples by requesting a loan from the Spanish Filipino elites at Manila to pay the back wages owed to the Indians, in addition to making such elites endure temporary austerity and solicit subsidies from New Spain in order to save the economy of the Philippines (which also was damaged by the loss of trade with Peru, Macau, Malacca and Tokugawa shogunate). Also the consolidation of Dutch Formosa, and then Tungning Kingdom after the Siege of Fort Zeelandia, generated a constant paranoid over the defense of the isles among both indigenous and colonizers (in which the Spanish authority over the protectorate of Tidore increased to avoid a war with Ternate and so with the Dutch East Indies). This post-war crisis of the mid-17th century, and the menace of Koxinga to invade the Philippines, caused the Spanish withdrawal from Maluku Islands and Sulu Archipelago, renouncing permanently for a sphere of influence over Indonesia or Borneo. Another damage was a loss of population among Visayans due to the Dutch Makassar-Muslim raids from Borneo, Sulawesi, Jailolo, Maluku and Ternate.
- In New Spain, Portuguese India and Portuguese Brazil were developed antisemitic sentiments due to the bad reputation developed by New Christians (mainly Jews) for having collaborated with the Protestant invaders and still being granted economical privileges by the Iberian Crowns (who needed of their capabilities as investors and businessman). The Goa Inquisition and Mexican Inquisition developed a campaign of persecution against such minority to punish them and to discredit them before the crown.
- In the Viceroyalty of Peru the pirate raids of the time became very attached to the memory of Peruvian culture, specially in local Catholic mysticism with the veneration of the Virgin of Mercy after Marian apparitions to Doña Isabel de Porras in an Ecstasy during the Dutch invasions of Callao in 1615 and 1624, in which the withdrawal of the Dutch was considered a miracle caused by the 20 hours of prayers did by Isabel de Porras and the Franciscans, being interpreted as a sign that God sided with the Catholic Counter-Reformation against the Lutherans and Calvinists, and that Virgin Mary Interceded to protect the Spanish Empire during those years of crisis. Another consequence was the development of a local patriotism very determinated by Anti-Protestantism, Anglophobe and Anti-Dutch sentiment among the Peruvians of the time harmed by the raids and horrified by the Iconoclasm practised in Northern Europe against the icons of God, the Virgin and the Saints.

== Effects on European conflict and propaganda ==
For contemporary European news media and chronicles (mainly in Germany), the global nature of the Thirty Years' War was a very prominent idea, as seventeenth-century observers frequently placed the military and political events of this conflict in a Transatlantic and even Global frame, reporting events from Ibero-America, South-West Africa and the East Indies alongside the campaigns in Central Europe. Periodical newspapers, newsletters and manuscript chronicles (like the ones of Volkmar Happe, Otto von Estorf, Christian II of Anhalt-Bernburg) linked transoceanic events—such as the Dutch invasions of Brazil and Chile, Revolts in Mexico, Portuguese-Kongo Wars, the arrival of the Spanish treasure fleet with Peruvian silver in Seville—to European military and fiscal crises, treating them as causally relevant to the fate of armies and states involucrated in the HRE's great war, seeing them as events that could alter the balance of power in Europe by weakening or strengthening metropolitan partners (specially the superpower that represented Habsburg Spain for the general population) and so, perceiving distant events into a single narrative of universal crisis as transoceanic economic flows and colonial warfare had observable impacts on European military capacity and diplomacy (leading to the Dutch Golden Age and Decline of Iberian Union).

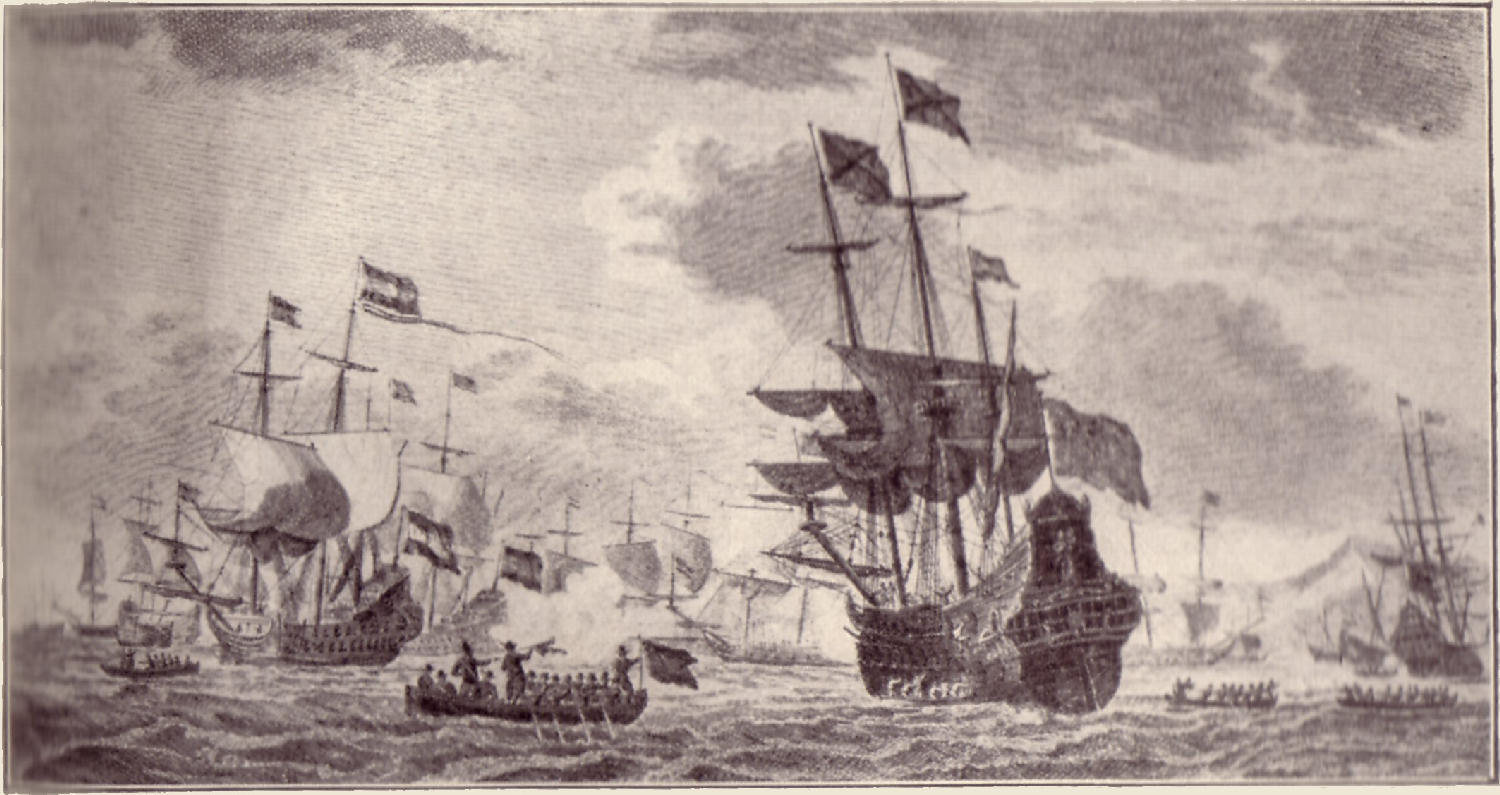
Piet Hein capturing the Spanish silver fleet at the Battle in the Bay of Matanzas, which had serious consequences for the Thirty Years' War

This printed and manuscript news culture created a discourse of simultaneity and connectedness that integrated the disturbances in colonial possessions into the temporal narrative of the conflict and helped contemporaries perceive the fighting as part of a wider, interlinked contest rather than as an exclusively local conflict or purely European war (the general population saw the destiny of the German civilisation and Christendom as something decided not only by their domestic affairs, but by battles around the world), recounting the European events that "led to the bloody Bohemian War which dragged on continuously for many years, creeping across virtually the entire world and devastating all the lands" with several oversea theatres (traditionally treated as non-related or merely peripheral) that had structural effects on the European conflict. For example, the importance of the Battle of Matanzas Bay, in which a Spanish treasure fleet was captured by the Dutch in Cuba, had immediate implications for troop pay, mercenary financing and the diplomatic leverage of the Imperial Side in benefit of the Protestant Coalition (the gains being used to finance the Siege of 's-Hertogenbosch).

== See also ==
- Thomas Roe
- Baloch–Portuguese conflicts
- Mughal–Portuguese conflicts
- Adil Shahi–Portuguese conflicts
- Maldivian–Portuguese conflicts
- Burmese–Portuguese conflicts
- Malay–Portuguese conflicts
- Forts and factories on the (West African) Gold Coast to 1872
