= Celina Olga Moniz =

Goan freedom fighter

Celina Olga Moniz was a Goan independence activist and social reformer active during Portuguese rule in Goa. She embraced radical methods of protest and endured imprisonment, while also defying social stigma in her pursuit of political and social justice.

== Early activism ==
Moniz became involved in anti-Portuguese struggle in Goa, aligning herself with movements that challenged colonial authority. She was among a cohort of Goan women who took steps to confront both colonial power and conservative social norms.

== Imprisonment ==
Due to her activism, Moniz was jailed by the Portuguese authorities. While in prison, she suffered the consequences of colonial punishment, which also carried social repercussions, especially for women dissenters.

Her imprisonment and defiance made her a notable figure among Goan independence activists, particularly in campaigns highlighting women’s roles in the Goan independence movement.
