= Dutch Celebes =

Dutch colony in modern-day Sulawesi, Indonesia

Dutch Celebes Celebes en Onderhoorigheden (nl) Sulawesi dan Kepulauannya (id)
- 1699–1946
- Flag Coat of arms
- Status: Dutch Colony; Part of the Great East (1938–1946)
- Capital: Makassar
- Common languages: Dutch, Malay
- Governor of Makassar/Governor of Celebes
- Commander
- Historical era: Imperialism
  - Dutch conquest of the Sultanate of Makassar: 1699
  - Incorporated: 1946
- Currency: Netherlands Indies gulden
Preceded by	Succeeded by
Portuguese Empire	State of East Indonesia

Dutch Celebes refers to the period of colonial governance on the southern part of Sulawesi island - as a commandment of the Dutch East India Company from 1699 until its demise in the early 1800s, and then as a part of the Netherlands Indies or Dutch East Indies until 1945. Dutch presence in the region started with the capture of Sulawesi from the Portuguese, and ended with the establishment of the State of East Indonesia. Celebes is now referred to as Sulawesi. Makassar, the capital, was also referred to as: Macassar, Makassar, Macaçar, Mancaçar, or Goa, Gowa (not to be confused with Goa, the capital of Portuguese India).

== History ==
Sulawesi prior to Dutch governance had been a part of the Sultanate of Gowa. In 1660 a large fleet under Johan van Dam bombarded Makassar. From 1667 onward the VOC held Fort Rotterdam in the port of Makassar. The fortress was established in 1669. After four months of conflict to force Sultan Hasanuddin to submit, on 18 November 1667 the Treaty of Bongaya was signed, by which Dutch governance was accepted. Celebes and Dependencies ("Celebes en Onderhoorigheden") was the name of a government of 1847-1924 and from 1925 of a residence of the Dutch East Indies, divided into sections. The capital was Makassar, which before 1847 had been the name of the government.

== Governors ==
- Johan Sautijn (-1737)
- Adriaan Hendrik Smout (1737-)
- Joan Gideon Loten (1744-1750)
- Roelof Blok
- Charles Christiaan Tromp
- A.J. Quarles de Quarles
- J. Grudelbach
- Petrus Theodorus Chassé (1800-1811)
- Jan David van Schelle (1821-1825)
- Albert Cornells de Brauw (1855-1857)
- Dirk Francois Schaap (1857-1859)
- Johannis Antonius Bakkers (1865)
- Willem Egbert Kroesen
- Henri Nicolas Alfred Swart

== See also ==
- Fort Rotterdam
- Dutch East Indies
- Makassar
