= Julius Wilhelm Van Verschoor =

Dutch navigator

Juan Wilhelmszn.Verschoor (fair-shore; 1575 in Zevenbergen – 1639 in Delft) was a Dutch navigator. He participated in attacks against Spanish possessions in the New World and explored Nassau Bay in Tierra del Fuego.

He sailed as rear admiral of a fleet that was equipped by order of the States General of Holland and Prince Maurice of Nassau for an expedition against Peru, under the command of Admiral Jacques l'Hermite, which left Amsterdam on April 29, 1623. They stopped at the Cape Verde islands, where rich prizes were secured, and, on February 1, 1624, arrived at Cape Peñas on Tierra del Fuego.

The admiral was already very sick, and after July 1623, the fleet was virtually commanded by Vice-Admirals Gheen Huygen Schapenham and Verschoor. On February 2, they entered the Strait of Le Maire, and, with the fleet being dispersed by winds, Verschoor entered Nassau Bay, between Navarino, Hoste, and Wollaston islands. His mathematician, Johan von Walbeck, made a chart of the southeastern coast of Tierra del Fuego and the Strait of Le Maire, which was at that time the most authentic map of the extremity of South America.

In March 1624, Verschoor was detached with a division for the American coast, while the admiral sailed for Juan Fernandez. Verschoor joined him there, and the fleet attacked Callao on May 12, burning thirty merchant vessels in the harbor. On May 23, Verschoor was sent to attack Guayaquil, which he partly burned, but he was repelled there and again at Pisco. After Hermite's death on June 2, 1624, Schapenham took the command-in-chief and, in opposition to Verschoor's advice, refused to attack Callao again, which could have been easily carried, and a new expedition against Pisco was decided upon; but the Dutch were driven back on August 26. When the fleet reached the coast of New Spain, Verschoor secured several rich prizes and was ordered to sail for the East Indies, with Schapenham returning by way of Cape Horn to the Atlantic. Verschoor arrived on March 2 at Ternate, in the Moluccas, and, with the vessels being assigned to other services, he returned to Holland to report to the States General.

== Documents ==
Verschoor's secretary, Hessel Gerritz, published the Journal van de Nassauche Vloot (Amsterdam, 1626). A German version, with additional remarks, was made by Adolf Decker, who had served as captain of marines in the expedition. It is entitled Journal oder Tag-Register der Nassauischen Flotte (Strasburg, 1629). Theodore de Bry published a later version of it in his Histori Americanæ (1634), but the best-known version was published in French in the Recueil des voyages de la Compagnie des Indes. Charles de Brosses also gave an account of the expedition in his Voyages aux Terres Australes, and Capt. James Burney published an English translation in his Voyages to the South Sea (London, 1811).
