= Battle of Pulo Buton =

Battle of Pulo Buton (1606)
- Part of Dutch–Portuguese War
Date	13–16 December 1606
Location	Pulo Buton
Result	Portuguese victory

Belligerents
Kingdom of Portugal	Dutch East India Company

Commanders and leaders
(Portugal) Álvaro de Menezes	(Dutch East India Company) Matelief de Jonge

Units involved
Unknown	(Dutch East India Company) Erasmus

Strength
7 galleons	9 ships

Casualties and losses
Heavy	Heavy; Erasmus severely damaged

The Battle of Pulo Buton (1606) was a naval engagement that took place in Pulo Buton, between a Portuguese fleet commanded by Dom Álvaro de Menezes and a Dutch force under Cornelis Matelief.

== Background ==
In 1606, the Portuguese, under the command of Dom Álvaro de Menezes, had been struggling to defend their holdings in the East from Dutch attacks. In an attempt to weaken the Portuguese position, the Dutch fleet, commanded by Matelief, had split their forces, concentrating on eliminating the remaining Portuguese vessels.

The Portuguese fleet, though diminished, was anchored in a strong defensive position near the bay of Pulo Buton. Dom Álvaro de Menezes, despite the absence of reinforcements and with only seven ships at his disposal, was determined to defend his fleet. The Dutch fleet, which had suffered losses in previous skirmishes, sought to exploit the Portuguese vulnerability.

== Battle ==
=== English sources ===
On 13 December 1606, Matelief's Dutch fleet attacked the Portuguese ships in the bay. The Dutch had already suffered heavy losses in earlier engagements, particularly in a failed attempt to destroy the Portuguese ships using a fireship on 8 December. The Portuguese, positioned close to the shore and with their guns concentrated on one side, managed to repel 4 or 5 hours of cannon attacks. The Erasmus came close to sinking, and the Dutch forces eventually realized that continuing the assault would lead to higher losses.

=== Dutch sources ===
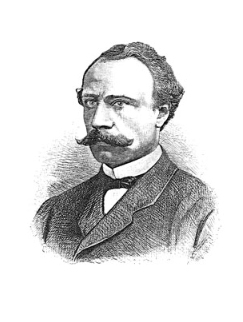
Jacob de Jonge, 1880

According to Jacob de Jonge in his book “De opkomst van het Nederlandsch gezag in Oost-Indië (1595-1610)”, Matelief chose not to engage directly in battle against the Portuguese, he instead evacuated the area to resupply and reinforce Dutch outposts in the Moluccas, which later he regretted doing so. He believed that a victory at Pulo Buton could have dealt a severe blow to the Portuguese.

== Aftermath ==
The Dutch retreated from the area on 16 December, with the Portuguese maintaining control over their position. The Dutch fleet, with their ships damaged and their morale weakened, could not continue their campaign against the Portuguese armada.

Matelief, after suffering considerable casualties, eventually gave up on further attacks and left to the Moluccas at the end of December.

== Bibliography ==
- Boxer, C. R. (1986). Portuguese Merchants and Missionaries in Feudal Japan, 1543-1640. Variorum Reprints. ISBN 0860781801.
- London, Japan Society (1971). Transactions and Proceedings of the Japan Society, London. Vol. 26–27. University of California.
- Jonge, Jan (1865). De opkomst van het Nederlandsch gezag in Oost-Indië (1595-1610): verzameling van onuitgegeven stukken uit het Oud-koloniaal archief (in Dutch). National Library of the Netherlands.
