= Expedition to the Unare =

- Part of the Eighty Years' War
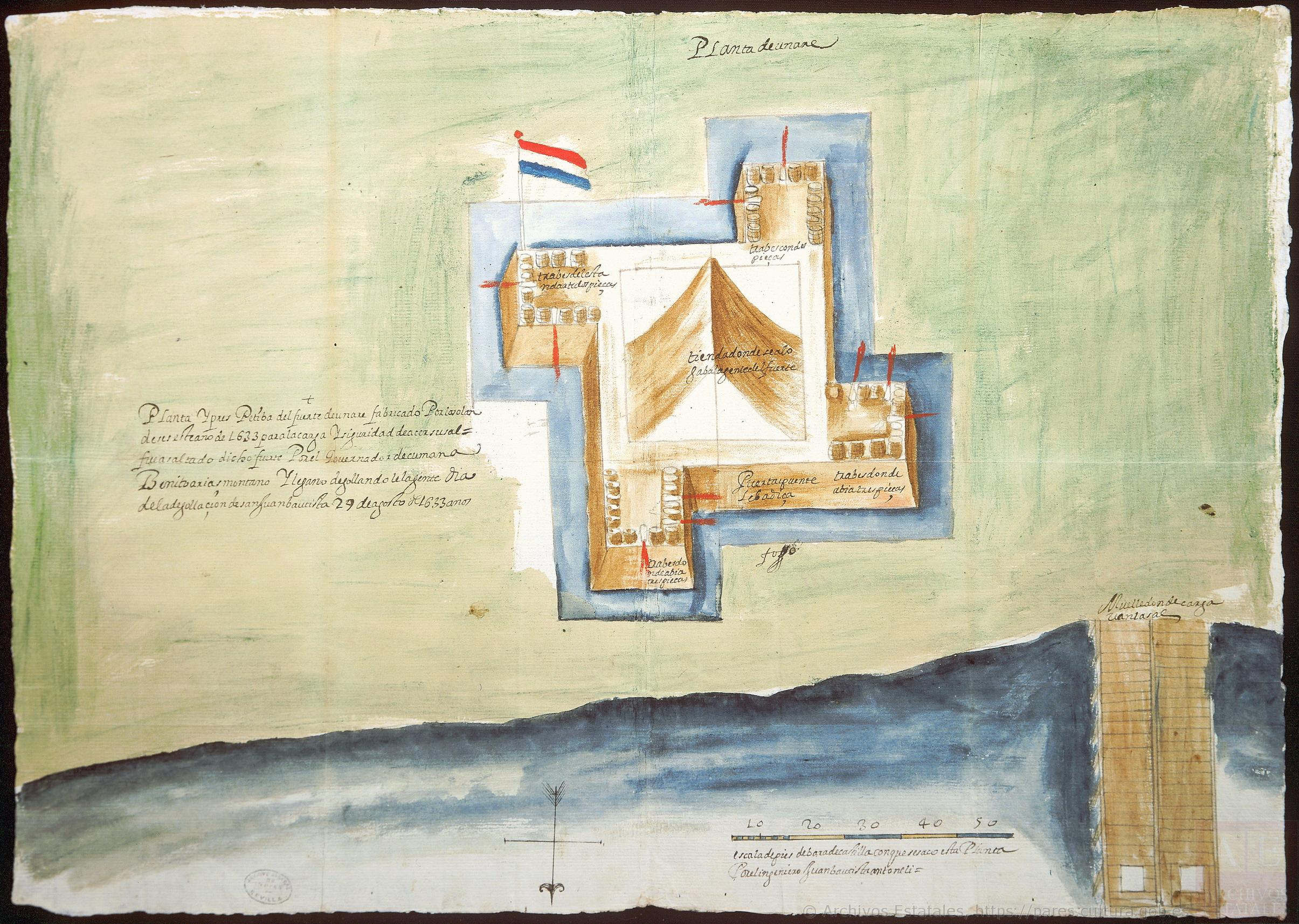
- Plan and perspective of the Dutch fort at the Unare, by Juan Bautista Antonelli.
Date	August, 1633
Location	Mouth of the Unare River, Captaincy General of Venezuela
Result	Spanish victory

Belligerents
Spain	West India Company

Commanders and leaders
(Spanish Empire) Benito Arias Montano	(Dutch West India Company) Unknown

Strength
95 Spanish soldiers 200 Cumanagoto auxiliaries 14 pirogues	200 zoutvaerders 10 cannons

Casualties and losses
3 dead and 4 wounded	80–100 dead and 36 captured

The Expedition to the Unare was a Spanish campaign in 1633 against the salt flats recently established by the Dutch West India Company on the mouth of the Unare River, in Venezuela. The battle ended with the Dutch being either killed or expelled from the land.

== Background ==
On 25 August 1633, Captain Bernardo Arias Montano, governor of Cumaná, sailed from the town with a flotilla of 14 pirogues carrying 95 Spanish soldiers and 200 indios amigos to evict the Dutch from the area. Sailing along the Borracha Islands and the Píritu Islets, embarking there more native allies, they arrived to the Unare on 28 August and during that night landed undetected on the Uchire beach, half a league from the Dutch outpost.

Scouts reported the next day that a Dutch fort and ten fluyts stood next to the salt flats. Arias Montano left 50 men to guard the pirogues and moved with the bulk of his force to attack the fort.

== Battle ==
On 30 August at dawn, the Spanish came out the jungle and assaulted the fortress under artillery fire from both its defenders and the Dutch ships. By laying boards over the moat and climbing up the walls, they succeeded in driving the Dutch zoutvaerders from the walls into a barrack at the center of the fort, where they made a last stand before surrendering.

Most of the defenders were either slain or captured, although some of them escaped to the ships, which sailed away as soon as the fort was taken. The Spanish had few casualties, most of them from an attack by natives allied to the Dutch that afternoon. Arias Montano ordered the outpost to be razed, which was done under the supervision of the engineer Juan Bautista Antonelli, and then reembarked with the prisoners and the booty.

== Aftermath ==
The Dutch came back on 1640, but were expelled again soon by Spanish forces under Joan Orpí.
