= François Wittert =

Dutch admiral

François Wittert (c. 1571 – 12 June 1610) was a Dutch admiral in the service of the Dutch Republic.

== Early life ==
François Wittert was born in Rotterdam, the son of Hendrik Adriaenz. Wittert and Volckgen Clementsdr. van Overschie.

== Naval career ==
He was an officer on the ship Rotterdam, part of an expedition of 14 ships that sailed on 17 June 1602, from Texel under the command of Wybrand van Warwijck, to the East Indies. His destination was Bantam. Once there, the king of Bantam gave the Dutch permission to build a fort to serve as a factory. Wittert was appointed as its president. He was also the first governor of Bantam from 1603 to 1605. After his return to the Netherlands, Wittert was appointed as vice-admiral of an expedition of 13 ships, that set sail towards East India on 22 December 1607, under command of Admiral Pieter Willemsz Verhoeff.

On 18 August, presumably 1608, Wittert ravaged Mozambique. He arrived at Bantam in 1609, and went on to erect a lodge on Sulawesi. On 22 May 1609, Verhoeff was killed by the Bandanese, and Wittert succeeded him as admiral. On 22 June, the King of Ternate signed a favourable agreement with him. On 22 September, Wittert sailed to the Philippines, where he landed on the island Mortir, which he named Nassau, before he sailed for Manila to do battle with the Spanish there in order to remove the Moluccas from Spanish authority.

He was able to capture 23 merchants vessels, winning a huge amount of plunder, but he was ambushed in Manila by a superior force on 23 April 1610, and killed. His base of operations was an island called Islas Hermanas near Manila, also called Witterts Island. This island was a future point of operations for Dutch expeditions.
