= Spanish conquest of the Moluccas =

- Part of the Eighty Years' War
| Date | April, 1606 |
| Location | Maluku Islands |
| Result | Spanish victory |
| Territorial changes | The Sultanate of Ternate becomes a Spanish vassal; Establishment of the Spanish Moluccas |

Belligerents
| (Spain) Spanish Empire; Sultanate of Tidore | Sultanate of Ternate; East India Company |

Commanders and leaders
| Pedro Bravo de Acuña; Mole Majimu | Mudafar Syah I |

Strength
| 36 ships, 3,095 Spanish and Filipino soldiers and sailors, 600 warriors from Tidore | 2,000–3,000 warriors, 43 heavy cannons |

Casualties and losses
| 15 dead, 20 wounded | Unknown |

The Spanish conquest of the Moluccas was a large-scale military campaign launched by the Spanish authorities of Manila in April 1606 in response to the alliance between the Sultanate of Ternate and the Dutch East India Company. The conquest of Ternate had been a goal for the Spanish since Sultan Babullah expelled the Portuguese from the island in 1575 and the Iberian Union between the Crowns of Spain and Portugal had been formed in 1580.

The campaign was conceived in 1601 by Pedro Bravo de Acuña, newly-appointed governor of the Philippines, while in New Spain. Its goals were to restore the Catholicism in the area, increase the Spanish reputation, take control of the wealthy clove trade and isolate the Muslims of Sulu and Maguindanao from their Ternatean allies. Following two years of conversations and planning, and after a failed attempt in 1603 to capture Ternate, in 1604 Philip III of Spain prompted the recruitment of large contingents of troops in Andalucía and New Spain for their transfer to the Philippines, where they arrived in February and June 1605. In the meantime, the Dutch East India Company drove the Portuguese from Ambon and Tidore, increasing the urge in Manila to launch the expedition.

A Spanish fleet of 36 ships was assembled in early 1606 in the port of Iloilo, in the island of Panay, with over 3,000 soldiers and sailors on board. It set sail in mid-February and reached Ternate in late-March, having made an escale at Zamboanga, in Mindanao. The Spanish, joined by the Sultan of Tidore and his forces, first expelled the Dutch from Tidore and then landed in Ternate, where they attacked and conquered the fort of Gammalamma. Sultan Mudafar Syah fled to the nearby island of Halmahera, but surrendered shortly after and pledged allegiance to the Spanish Crown. So was established the Spanish province of Maluco, which would extend from the north of Sulawesi to Morotai and from Siau to Bacan.
