= Anti-Portuguese sentiment =

Hostility toward Portugal, the Portuguese people or the Portuguese language and culture

Anti-Portuguese sentiment or Lusophobia is hostility, racism, hatred, and/or discrimination toward Portugal, the Portuguese people or the Portuguese language and culture.

== Etymology ==
Like "Lusitanic", the word "Lusophobia" (Portuguese: lusofobia) derives from "Lusitania", the Ancient Roman province that comprised what is now Central and Southern Portugal and Extremadura, and "phobia", which means "fear of". The opposite concept is "Lusophilia".

== Brazil ==
In the 19th century, the term lusofobia was often used to describe nationalist sentiments in Brazil, a former colony of the Portuguese Empire, with liberal politicians in Rio de Janeiro and Pernambuco advocating the reduction of Portuguese immigration and involvement in the Brazilian economy, although almost all of them were of Portuguese descent.

In Rio de Janeiro, the "Jacobinos", a small national radical group, were the strongest opponents of the galegos, the Portuguese immigrants, who have always been the biggest ethnocultural community in Brazil.

In the immediate aftermath of Pedro I of Brazil's downfall in 1831, the poor mixed-race and black people, including slaves, staged anti-Portuguese riots in Salvador.

== United Kingdom ==
In 2007, after the three-year-old Madeleine McCann disappeared from Praia da Luz, in the Algarve region, in southern Portugal, many British media outlets wrote articles highly critical of Portugal and Portuguese police that portrayed Portugal as a "backwards banana republic". Others in the media promoted anti-Portuguese sentiment with ideas such as boycotting Portugal as a holiday destination, but that was not reflected in general public opinion, which saw record numbers of British tourists visit Portugal. Estimates were that a record 2 million British tourists holidayed in Portugal in 2007. Notable anti-Portuguese articles by Tony Parsons received a record number of complaints to the Press Complaints Commission for that year.
