= Raid of Visayas =

Moro raid into Visayas islands, late 16th century

Raid of Visayas (1599–1600)
- Part of Spanish–Moro conflict
Date	1599–1600
Location	Visayas, Philippines
Result	First raid: Maguindanao victory Second raid: Spanish victory

Belligerents
Spanish Empire	Sultanate of Maguindanao; Sultanate of Buayan

Commanders and leaders
Juan Garcia de Sierra	Datu Sali; Datu Silongan

Strength
First raid: Unknown; Second raid: 70 men	First raid: 3,000 men 50 caracoas Second raid: 4,000 men 70 caracoas

Casualties and losses
Many killed All ships in river burned 800 captured	Unknown

The raids of Visayas took place in 1599 and 1600. The allied Moro fleets of Maguindanao, Buayan and Sulu conducted two raids on the Spanish-held islands of Visayas.

== Background ==
After the unsuccessful Mindanao expedition in 1596, Juan Ronquillo was sent to Mindanao to lead the Spanish camp. He engaged in battles against the Mindanaons, who had allied with the Ternateans, and managed to defeat the Moro army. Encouraged by this victory, the council of war instructed Juan to inflict as much damage as possible. However, Juan disagreed and refused to abandon his camp.

Around the same time, Sulu had already submitted to the Spanish in 1598, and 30 soldiers were sent there for supplies. One of the Mindanao chiefs, the brother-in-law of the Sulu sultan, attacked and killed 13 Spanish soldiers. In response, an expedition of 600 men led by Juan Pacheco was launched to punish the Sulus, but they were repelled, resulting in a loss of 30 soldiers, including Pacheco.

In 1599, news arrived that English ships had been sighted in Java and Ternate, with 400 men on board. The Spanish council of war decided to withdraw their fort in La Caldera to prevent the English from capturing it. However, the Spanish governor, Francisco de Tello de Guzmán, held a council to discuss the fate of the fort. Despite the audience advising against withdrawal, the governor ordered the garrison of La Caldera to burn the fort and retreated.

== Raid of 1599 ==
After the Spanish had withdrawn from Mindanao, in July 1599, the Mindanao Moros assembled a fleet of 50 caracoas carrying 3,000 men armed with arquebuses, swords, and shields. They set sail towards the Oton and Panay islands, passing the Negros islands and arrived at the Panay River. Five leagues away from the chief settlement, where the Alcalde mayor and some Spanish were residing, they landed and proceeded to sack the settlement.

Houses and churches were burned, and numerous native Christians, including men, women, and children, were taken captive. The attackers pursued their victims more than 10 leagues up the river, destroying all the crops in the process. Additionally, the Spanish vessels on the river were set on fire, and the Moros departed with captured goods and prisoners, including 800 individuals.

Similar raids were carried out on other islands and towns they encountered, such as Cebu and Negros. Afterward, the Moros returned to Mindanao with their spoils, consisting of goods, gold, and captives.

== Raid of 1600 ==
The Mindanao and Sulu forces returned with a formidable fleet of 70 well-equipped ships and 4,000 men. Led by the same commanders and some Sulu Chiefs, their objective was to capture and sack the Spanish town of Arevalo, which was under the governance of Captain Juan Garcia de Sierra, the Alcalde Mayor of the province.

Upon receiving news of the advancing Moro fleet, Captain Juan Garcia de Sierra gathered the Spanish residents in the town, secured the area, and repaired the wooden fort. Alongside 70 men, Juan awaited the enemy's arrival.

The Moros landed near the settlement with a force of 1,500 men and advanced towards the town. The Spanish forces divided into troops, launched a counterattack, and opened fire on the enemy, forcing them to retreat. This successful defense caused confusion among the Moro ranks. As a result, the Moros suffered heavy losses and decided to halt at Guimaras before eventually returning to Mindanao.

== Aftermath ==
The attack by the Mindanao Moros inflicted significant damage on the Visayas islands. The Spanish authorities kept the natives subjugated, paying tributes, and disarmed. The Spanish neither protected them from the Moros nor allowed them to defend themselves. As a result, many natives revolted, seeking refuge in the mountains and refusing to return to their homes. However, the Spanish managed to appease them with promises and gifts.

While Manila regretted the injuries caused by the Moro raids, they were ill-equipped to prevent future attacks due to a lack of ships and other resources. The Moro raids on the Visayas islands escalated to the point where they were expected to reach Manila itself, plundering and devastating the area. This prompted an expedition in 1602 that ended in failure.

== See also ==
- Spanish occupation of Jolo (1638)
- Spanish–Moro conflict
- Mindanao expedition
- Jolo expedition (1630)
- Jolo expedition (1602)

== Sources ==
- Saleeby, Najeeb Mitry (1908). The History of Sulu. Manila: Bureau of Printing.
