= Governor Silva =

Governor Silva may refer to:

- Fernándo de Silva (fl. 1620s), interim governor of the Philippines
- Juan de Silva (died 1616), governor of the Philippines
- Benedita da Silva (born 1942), governor of the State of Rio de Janeiro
- Lucius Flavius Silva (fl. late-1st-century) Roman governor of the province of Iudaea

== See also ==
- Ernest de Silva (1887–1957), offered appointment as Ceylonese governor general, but declined
