= Jolo expedition (1630) =

Battle in Jolo, 17th century

- Part of Spanish–Moro conflict
Date	March 1630
Location	Jolo, Philippines
Result	Sulu victory

Belligerents
Spanish Empire	Sultanate of Sulu

Commanders and leaders
Lorenzo de Olaso (WIA)	Muwallil Wasit I of Sulu

Strength
350-400 Spanish; 2,000–2,500 Philippine natives 1 galley 3 brigantines 12 frigates 50 caracoas	Unknown

Casualties and losses
Some killed 8 wounded	Unknown

The Sulu Expedition of 1630 was an unsuccessful military campaign by the Spanish Empire to capture the island of Jolo. Launched from the Spanish Philippines to suppress Sulu pirates, the expedition ended in failure.

== Background ==
In 1602, Gallinatos’s expedition occurred After three months of fighting at Jolo, he was unable to reduce the fortifications of the town and retired. In 1616 a large Sulu fleet destroyed Pantao in the Camarines and the shipyards of Cavite and exacted large sums for the ransom of Spanish prisoners. Moro fleets in 1625 sacked Catbalogan in Samar.

In 1628, the Spanish governor, Juan Niño de Tabora, sent Cristobal de Lugo on an expedition to Jolo, leading 100 Spanish and 1,000 natives. The Spanish then began raiding the vicinity, capturing weapons, gunpowder, destroying several sulu tombs, setting fire to over 60 joangas, farmhouses, and rice fields, and releasing many captives. In addition, they seized over 100 boats. Raids did not stop after all. In 1629, the Moros raided Samar and Leyte.

== Expedition ==
In 1630, another expedition was launched against Jolo with a force of 350 or 400 Spanish soldiers alongside 2,000 or 2,500 native soldiers and an armada of 1 galley, 3 brigantines, 12 frigates, and 50 caracoas. They had such considerable supplies that it was quite sufficient for another conquest, and they were led by Dom Lorenzo de Olaso. The Spanish force departed from Dapitan on March 17, a port closest to enemy lands. Once they arrived, the beaches were covered with a large number of Sulus defending the terrain; the Spanish attacked them and put them on route; they chased them to their fort; the Spanish began attacking the fort; the Sulus defending the fort valiantly managed to kill some Spanish troops and wound eight men, including Lorenzo, who was then overthrown from the hill as if he were dead. Seeing this, the Spanish gave up the assault and retired demoralized.

After this defeat, the Spanish began touring other neighboring coastal settlements, where they burned villages and killed 40 of the inhabitants. They freed some captives, but a violent storm struck and forced them to weigh anchor and retire in secret.

== See also ==
- Spanish occupation of Jolo (1638)
- Spanish–Moro conflict
- Mindanao expedition
- Jolo expedition (1602)
