= Jolo expedition (1602) =

Spanish battle in Jolo, early 17th century

- Part of Spanish–Moro conflict
Date	February – May 1602
Location	Jolo, Philippines
Result	Sulu victory

Belligerents
Spanish Empire	Sultanate of Sulu

Commanders and leaders
Juan Juárez de Gallinato	Batarah Shah Tengah

Strength
200 men	1,000 men

Casualties and losses
Heavy	Heavy

The Sulu Expedition of 1602 was an unsuccessful military campaign by the Spanish Empire to capture the island of Jolo. Launched from the Spanish Philippines to suppress Sulu pirates, the expedition ended in failure.

== Prelude ==
The Mindanaons and the Sulus began raiding with their fleets the islands of Visayas to a point that its expected that they would come as far as Manila. In order to stop these raids, the Spanish governor of Philippines, Francisco de Tello de Guzmán, determined that an expedition to Sulu should be made at once without delays to subjugate the island put their sultan to obedience. He prepared an expedition of 200 Spanish soldiers, ships and artillery, with provisions that would last for four months—the expected length of the campaign. They were led by Juan Juárez de Gallinato.

== Expedition ==
Gallinato arrived in Sulu at the bar of the river of the island, which is two leagues from the town of Jolo. He began landing his men, artillery, and provisions and left some guards on ships. The town of Jolo is situated on a very high hill above some cliffs and has two roads that lead there, but they are narrow. The Sulus fortified their position and began preparing for the Spanish attack. They evacuated the women and children and called for aid from the Mindanao, Brunei, and Ternate.

Gallinato stationed his camp near the town before the aid from other sultanates arrived. He dispatched envoys to the sultan and chiefs of the island, calling them to surrender and promising good terms would be given. While waiting for an answer, he began fortifying and entrenching his position. The sultan responded with a fake and deceptive answer, in an attempt to make them stay in such an unhealthy spot until the rains set in and his supplies would run short.

After this, the Sulus swarmed down from the fort with a force of over 1,000 men with arquebuses and other weapons and assaulted the camp of the Spanish, but as soon as the Sulus discharged their arquebuses, the Spanish opened fire from their cannons and then their arquebuses, killing many of the Sulus and forcing them to retreat. The Spanish pursued them to the middle of the hill, killing and wounding them; however, the roads were too narrow to pass. The Sulus began heavily bombarding them from the heights, and large stones were hurled down upon them, forcing them to retreat to their position. The Spanish attempted to return to the fort, but to no avail.

When Gallinato saw rain coming, his men were becoming sick, and his provisions were depleted, he sent a message in late May to the governor of the Philippines about what had happened. The governor told him to continue the campaign even if he could do nothing more; however, Gallinato was worn out, so he destroyed his camp and withdrew from the island.

== See also ==
- Spanish occupation of Jolo (1638)
- Spanish–Moro conflict
- Mindanao expedition
- Jolo expedition (1630)
