= Mindanao expedition =

Spanish expedition to Mindanao, late 16th century

Mindanao expedition (1596)
- Part of Spanish–Moro conflict
Date	February 1596
Location	Mindanao, Philippines
Result	Maguindanao victory

Belligerents
Spanish Empire	Sultanate of Maguindanao

Commanders and leaders
Esteban Rodriguez de Figueroa †; Juan de la Xara	Datu Silonga; Datu Malaria; Datu Bulusan

Strength
6,000 men: 214 Spanish	Unknown

Casualties and losses
Heavy	Unknown

In 1596, the Spanish army launched an expedition to the island of Mindanao to conquer and pacify it; however, the expedition ended in failure and they were forced to withdraw.

== Background ==
By the time the end of the Granada War came, Islam had become the most dominant religion in southwestern Mindanao and Jolo. When the Spanish commander, Miguel López de Legazpi, arrived in Pasig in 1571, two Muslim chiefs were established in Tondo and Manila, and the Filipino Muslims showed hostility to the Spanish. The Spanish called these Muslims "Moros," who shared the name with north African moors, reminding them of seven hundred years of Reconquista, thus beginning a long conflict with Filipino Moros that would last for three hundred years.

The first conflict happened in 1578, when the Spanish force led by Francisco de Sande invaded Brunei, with a force of 400 Spanish, 300 Borneans, and 1,500 Filipinos, the expedition was largely successful; however, an epidemic struck the Spanish army and they were forced to retreat. in 1596, Esteban Rodriguez de Figueroa was given the title to rule Mindanao for conquest at his own expense.

== Expedition ==
Esteban Rodriguez then began preparing his men and ships; with some galleys, galleots, and frigates, he set out with a force of 214 Spanish for the island of Mindanao in February 1596. He took Captain Juan de la Xara as his master-of-camp and some religious members of the Society of Jesus to give instruction, as well as many natives for the service of the camp and fleet. He reached the Mindanao River and met two settlements, Tampakan and Lumakan, who were both hostile to the Moros of Bwayan. They received the Spanish in a well-mannered manner and joined them, bringing a large force with them; the total army was 6,000 men.

Without a delay, they advanced about 8 leagues, or 24 miles, from the river to Bwayan, the principal settlement of the Bwayan people, where its greatest chiefs had fortified themselves on many sides. The Bwayans were led by Datus Silonga, Malaria, and Bulusan. The Spanish arrived in the settlement, anchored their fleet, and landed a large number of men, but before besieging the fort, the Bwayans attacked the Spanish on various sides; due to the swampiness of the place and the denseness of the Thickets, they couldn't defend unitedly.

Estaban Rodriguez was watching the events in his flagship, seeing the confusion in the Spanish ranks. He took his weapons and joined his men with three or four men and a servant, but as he was crossing the thick jungle, a moro attacked Estaban and dealt him a severe blow to the head. His men killed the moro and took Estaban back to his camp. Immediately after Juan de la Xara took command and withdrew with his troops to the fleet, leaving behind several Spanish killed. Estaban did not regain consciousness and soon died the next day. Juan then later arrived at the friendly settlement of Tampakan, where he would build a Spanish settlement called "Murica."

== See also ==
- Spanish occupation of Jolo (1638)
- Spanish–Moro conflict
- Jolo expedition (1602)
- Jolo expedition (1630)
