= Alonso Fajardo de Tenza =

Spanish military official (??–1624)

16th Governor-General of the Philippines
- In office July 3, 1618 – July 1624
- Monarchs: Philip III of Spain; Philip IV of Spain
- Governor: (Viceroy of New Spain); Diego Fernández de Córdoba, 1st Marquess of Guadalcázar; Paz de Valecillo; Diego Carrillo de Mendoza, 1st Marquess of Gelves
- Preceded by: Andrés de Alcaraz
- Succeeded by: Jeronimo de Silva

Personal details
- Died: July 1624

Don Alonso Fajardo de Tenza y de Guevara, Córdoba y Velasco, Knight of Alcantara, Lord of Espinardo (died July 1624, in the Philippines) was Spanish Governor-General and Captain-General of the Islands of the Philippines from 3 July 1618 until his death.

== Biography ==
Fajardo de Tenza was a native of Murcia, son of Admiral Don Luis Fajardo and wife Doña Luisa de Tenza, Lady of Espinardo, and a Knight of the Order of Alcántara. He arrived at Cavite in the Philippines on 2 July 1618, and took up the governorship the following day. (Although some sources say he took office on 8 June.) He took over from the Audiencia of Manila, which had been governing the colony since 1616 in the absence (and later death) of the previous Viceroy, Juan de Silva.

The sixth Dutch blockade of Manila took place between 12 October 1618 and the end of May 1619. Anticipating the blockade, Governor Fajardo sent a ship to Macau in September 1618 to buy ammunition, to engage in trade and, through the embassy of Dominican Father Bartolomé Martínez, to warn the Chinese against sending sampans to Manila, as they would surely be intercepted by the Dutch fleet.

In early May 1619, some Japanese ships arrived at Manila and were allowed to enter the harbor by the Dutch. At the same time, Governor Fajardo was preparing a defensive fleet. He was able to assemble two large ships, two medium-sized ships, two pataches and four galleys. When the Dutch realized the Spaniards were ready to fight, they left the vicinity of Manila. They went on to pillage a native town in Ilocos and then left the archipelago. Some Dutch galleons were reportedly sunk at Ilocos.

In February 1620 Governor Fajardo dispatched an expedition under Captain García de Aldana y Cabrera, Governor of Pangasinan, to find and take control of gold mines said to be in the possession of Indigenous in Itogon. The expedition reached Bua, which they found burned to the ground. However they constructed a fort there, which they named Santísima Trinidad. An inspection of the mines showed them to be comparatively deep and provided with an extensive drainage system, although some were filled with water. Only one appeared to have a considerable vein of ore. This one extended to a depth and width of twenty meters and had been worked on by some eight hundred Ygolotes.

Fajardo founded the Convent of Santa Clara in 1621.

Reportedly, his wife had an extramarital affair with a former Jesuit. In 1621 Governor Fajardo had her killed, and he demolished the house of her paramour, where the couple had apparently met. According to legend, tamarind trees spontaneously grew on the spot, which is said to be the symbol of the couple's bitter-sweet love affair. This location is still pointed out to visitors in Manila. It is Plaza Samplucan, on General Luna Street in Intramuros, Manila.

In 1623 Governor Fajardo suppressed an insurrection in the Visayas. The following July (1624), he died, reportedly from melancholy. Again, the Audiencia took over in the absence of a viceroy, until Fernándo de Silva arrived from New Spain in June 1625.

His nephew, Diego Fajardo Chacón, was also Governor of the Philippines, from 1644 to 1653.

Political offices
Preceded by Juan de Silva	Spanish Governor-General of the Philippines; 1618–1624	Succeeded by Fernándo de Silva
