= Andrés de Alcaraz =

15th Governor-General of the Philippines
- In office April 19, 1616 – July 3, 1618
- Monarch: Philip III of Spain
- Governor: (Viceroy of New Spain); Diego Fernández de Córdoba, 1st Marquess of Guadalcázar
- Preceded by: Juan de Silva
- Succeeded by: Alonso Fajardo de Tenza

Andrés de Alcaraz was an auditor licentiate taking over military affairs before becoming the 15th governor-general of the Philippines of the Philippines under Spanish colonial rule. He is the second governor-general of the Philippines from the Real Audiencia of Manila.

== Governor General of the Philippines ==
The successor of Juan de Silva, who died in his expedition to Malacca, as Governor-General was supposed to be Jeronimo de Silva, his uncle, but the latter was fighting the Dutch in the Moluccas so the Audiencia Real took charge of political affairs and Auditor Licentiate Alcaraz took charge of military affairs by royal decree in March 1616. The Philippines, being a Spanish colony, had been involved in the Eighty Years' War. At the start of his term, Alcaraz sought to raise an army to equip a new fleet of galleons and galleys to battle the Dutch fleet, which had been a menace to the archipelago for years. He needed 1,000 men, but he obtained only 600. Hence, he furnished 380 men from Manila, along with 34 captains, 80 sergeants and 180 soldiers.

During his term also, Dutch naval officer Joris van Spilbergen and his fleet of 10 galleons formed a blockade at Manila Bay, after being defeated in Iloilo on September 30, 1616. This was faced by a Spanish armada of seven galleons under Juan Ronquillo del Castillo. This was the Second Battle of Playa Honda, which occurred on April 14, 1617. Spillbergen's flagship sank with other two galleons, and the Dutch repulsed. Jeronimo de Silva returned on September 30, 1617, taking over military affairs. However, the Audiencia still took charge of the country as a whole. In 1618, the government collected 160,000 tributes.

== Notes ==
Preceded by Juan de Silva	Spanish Governor - Captain General of the Philippines; 1616–1618	Succeeded by Alonso Fajardo de Entenza
