= Fernándo de Silva =

Spanish diplomat

Governor-General of the Philippines
- In office July 1624 – June 28/29, 1626
- Monarch: Philip IV of Spain
- Governor: (Viceroy of New Spain); Diego Carrillo de Mendoza, 1st Marquess of Gelves; Rodrigo Pacheco, 3rd Marquess of Cerralvo
- Preceded by: Alonso Fajardo de Entenza
- Succeeded by: Juan Niño de Tabora

Fernándo de Silva was a Spanish diplomat and colonial official. From July 1625 to June 28, 1626, he was interim governor of the Philippines.

== Background ==
A native of Ciudad Rodrigo, Fernando de Silva was a knight of the Order of Santiago. He was Spanish ambassador to Persia. Later he was named interim governor of the Philippines by the viceroy of New Spain, Rodrigo Pacheco y Osorio, marqués de Cerralvo. During his administration he was also captain general of the Philippines and president of the Audiencia of Manila.

== As governor of the Philippines ==
The Spanish royal Council of State sent to King Philip IV on March 7, 1625, a report on the appointment of a governor for the Philippines to replace Alonso Fajardo y Tenza. In 1623 Fajardo had sought permission to return to Spain, asking for a better office as a reward for his services and those of his father and other ancestors. Before he could leave the Philippines, he died (July 1624). The council's report listed eleven candidates, with the merits and services of each and the number of votes each received in the council. The report was submitted directly to the king, for him to make his choice. Juan Niño de Tabora received the appointment, but in the meantime the death of Fajardo necessitated the appointment of an interim governor. This was Fernándo de Silva.

Silva had been in the Philippines before, leaving in 1621. He returned to take up the position of governor in 1625, arriving at Cavite on July 8. (He had sailed from Acapulco on April 6.)

On June 1, 1625, just before Silva's arrival, King Philip granted an annual income of 1,000 ducats for 16 years for the support of the Jesuit convent of St. Augustine in Manila, and another 1,000 ducats annually for the Jesuit college there. These revenues were to be taken from tribute from the "Indians" in "vacant" encomiendas (those with no private individual receiving the income).

== First report to the king, 1625 ==
Silva sent a written report back to the king on August 4, 1625, notifying the king of his arrival in Manila and informing the king of the state of the colony as Silva found it. The report claimed that the Audiencia of Manila had exceeded its authority, was beset by dissension, and had governed badly in the year it had been in charge. Silva had already annulled the Audiencia's assignment of encomiendas and their appointments to army and navy offices.

The treasury was empty — worse, the colony was in debt to lenders and to soldiers for their pay. There was a continuing revolt in Cagayan, which Silva was taking steps to control. The Spanish still maintained an outpost at Terrenate, in the Moluccas. The king of Terrenate was still held as a hostage in Manila.

Silva also reported on the gold mines at Itogon, which the Spanish had taken possession of in 1620. More than 50,000 pesos had been spent on the mines, and ore was sent to New Spain for assaying. However, nothing was found, and the Spanish abandoned their fort and the mines.

Some time before, the Crown had ordered an increase of 2% in the duty on goods sent from the Philippines to New Spain. Silva reported that the additional tax had greatly decreased trade, and recommended that it be abolished.

Silva's report also contained the news that the Dutch were building a fort in Formosa (Taiwan), with the aid of the Chinese there. This was Fort Zeelandia. Silva proposed constructing a Spanish fort in another part of the island.

== Second report to the king, 1626 ==
Silva's second report to the king was dated July 31, 1626, days after he had been replaced as governor by Juan Niño de Tabora. Silva reported much improvement in the financial situation, with commodities being cheap and in good supply. The debt of the treasury to lenders had been reduced from 110,000 pesos to 25,000. A stone bridge over the Pasig River was under construction.

He also reported that cannon had been cast, and the colony was now fully supplied with them. He reported on the construction of four ships. (One was finished and the others were expected soon to be.) The revolt in Cagayan had been partially controlled with the help of the two additional companies Silva had sent there.

The Dutch had now completed their fort in Formosa. Silva had ordered the construction of a rival Spanish fort in northern Taiwan, at 25° N latitude. This had been accomplished under the direction of Sergeant Major Antonio Carreño de Valdes. Carreño's force had first arrived at the site of the new fort on May 11, 1626.

Silva also reported that the Spanish had been banned from trading with Japan, on pain of death. (This was part of the Japanese persecution of Christians. Among the Europeans, only the Dutch were allowed to trade there, and they were greatly restricted.)

Political offices
Preceded by Alonso Fajardo y Tenza	Interim Governor of the Philippines; 1625–1626	Succeeded by Juan Niño de Tabora
