= Juan Niño de Tabora =

Spanish general (??–1632)

Governor-General of the Philippines
- In office June 29, 1626 – July 22, 1632
- Monarch: Philip IV of Spain
- Governor: (Viceroy of New Spain); Rodrigo Pacheco, 3rd Marquess of Cerralvo
- Preceded by: Fernándo de Silva
- Succeeded by: Lorenzo de Olaza

Personal details
- Died: July 22, 1632

Juan Niño de Tabora (died July 22, 1632), was a Spanish general and colonial official. From June 29, 1626, until his death on July 22, 1632, he was governor of the Philippines.

== Early life ==
Juan Niño de Tabora was born in Galicia. Like many Spanish noblemen of the day, he spent part of his early years in the Habsburg Netherlands, where he served in the Army of Flanders and at the court of the Archdukes Albert and Isabella. Due to the influence of his powerful uncle, Rodrigo Niño y Lasso, Count of Añover, he became a Gentleman of the Archduke's Bedchamber and was given the command of a company of lancers as well as a knighthood in the Order of Calatrava.

== As governor of the Philippines ==
Nominated governor and captain general of the Philippines and president of the Royal Audiencia of Manila, he left New Spain for the Philippines on March 25, 1626, aboard the galleon El Almirante. He brought with him a wooden statue, carved in New Spain, of the Virgin Mary. During a three-month voyage beset by storms and one shipboard fire, this statue was thought to have protected the ship. After his arrival on June 29, 1626, Niño de Tabora ordered that it be welcomed into the colony with pomp and ceremony. This statue became known as Nuestra Señora de la Paz y Buen Viaje (Our Lady of Peace and Good Voyage). It became the patron of the Manila-Acapulco galleons. It is located today in the church in Antipolo.

== The expedition to Formosa ==
In 1627 he was in command of a naval squadron sent to Formosa (Taiwan) to resupply the Spanish fort there and to attempt to dislodge the Dutch from their fort on the island. This squadron originally included four galleons, three pataches and two galleys. However, the intended flagship, the galleon, Concepción, was heavily loaded with a cargo of tiles that caused it to spring a leak. It was left behind when the other ships sailed. Niño de Tabora was aboard the new flagship, the San Yldefonso. The ships sailed on August 17. This was late in the season, and contrary weather was expected. The governor sent the small ship Rosario on ahead, with a considerable quantity of food for the Spanish and Filipino colonists.

The fleet reached only as far as northern Luzon, before the galleons were forced to turn back to Cavite by fierce storms, contrary winds and high seas. They arrived back at Cavite on September 6, 1627. The galleys did continue to Formosa and sighted the Dutch fort before also returning. Upon their arrival back at Luzon, at Ylocos, they were beset by such a fierce storm that they were sunk in the harbor.

The expedition was postponed until the next year. It was later learned that the Dutch in Formosa were much relieved. Being weak, they had intended avoid battle and abandon their fort at the appearance of the Spanish.

The Rosario, meanwhile, arrived at the Spanish fort with its cargo of food. This was the first resupply ship from Manila in more than a year. It was very welcome, because there was a shortage of food.

Earlier that year, the Spanish had sent Captain Antonio de Vera with twenty soldiers to negotiate for food with a friendly chief not far from their fort. At first the Spanish and Filipinos were treated well, although not allowed to conclude their business in one or two months. Then however, on a joint hunting expedition, the Spanish and Filipinos were attacked by the Formosans. Seven Spaniards and Filipinos, including Captain Vera, were killed, as well as some of the Formosans, including the chief.

When the Rosario arrived at the Spanish fort with food and soldiers, it was decided to attack the Formosans to revenge the earlier deaths. When the Spanish-Filipino force of 100 infantrymen arrived at the site, the Formosans fled. The Spanish filled four small cargo ships with rice and took some prisoners. Then they returned to their fort, without burning the villages. The Rosario then returned to Manila, which it entered on February 21, 1628.

== The expedition to Macau ==
When the Spanish galleons arrived back in Manila, news was received that Dutch ships were lying in wait for the five Portuguese galliots about to return to Macau from Manila, laden with silver. Since they were ready, Governor Niño de Tabora ordered the two galleons to accompany the Portuguese ships as an escort. He did not accompany the expedition. The Portuguese paid 20,000 pesos for the escort.

The Spanish galleons were again beset by storms and after many dangers finally made the coast of China, at Sanchuan, about 30 leagues from Macau. The Dutch had already been defeated by the Portuguese of Macau (August 25, 1627), and had abandoned their positions. The Spanish vessels had seen no Dutch on the voyage. The Portuguese were angry that they had spent 20,000 pesos unnecessarily. The Spanish did manage to capture a merchant ship sailing from Siam for Canton, with tribute for China, and two other Siamese ships. This was in retaliation for the Siamese seizure of a rich Spanish ship five years before.

The galleons finally returned to Manila on June 13, 1628, after a nearly continuous voyage of eight months. More than 40 men had died.

== War with Jolo ==
Governor Niño de Tabora established a shipyard in the province of Camarines in Luzon in 1628. The sultan of Jolo, who had not been in rebellion against the Spanish for some years, captured some vessels and also the shipyard.

When he was informed of this, the governor ordered retaliation against Jolo. A force from Cebu of 200 Spaniards and 1,600 Filipino allies landed on Jolo on April 22, 1628. They captured the village at the foot of the hill where the king's fort was. This was burned, along with a large quantity of rich and many boats. On orders of the governor, they also found three royal tombs, highly esteemed by the Joloans, and destroyed those. The Spanish were under orders not to attack the fort, which was deemed too strong for a force of their size.

Some Joloans were killed and others captured. Some of their captives were freed, but not all. The single Spaniard, a woman, who had been captured by the Joloans at the shipyard was not freed because terms for her ransom could not be agreed upon. The Spanish force took much booty, and did not lose a single man.

== Other events during his administration ==
In 1628 another Spanish force attacked insurgents in the province of Cagayan, Luzon. They burned eight villages and laid waste the fields around them.

The parían, or Chinese quarter outside the walls of Manila, was almost completely destroyed by fire in early 1628. Niño de Tabora established new regulations for the employment of Filipinos intended to reduce their exploitation and guarantee payment for their labor on public works. Fearing an attack from Japan, Niño de Tabora improved the defenses of Manila.

The old Sultan of Ternate, a hostage of the Spanish for many years, finally died in Manila.

On August 4, 1628, Niño de Tabora wrote to the king that the revenues for the previous year amounted to 180,000 pesos from New Spain; 90,000 pesos for licenses (including the head tax on the Chinese); and 50,000 pesos from other revenues (duties, sales of offices, and the 20,000 pesos paid by the Portuguese in Macau). Expenses were more than 500,000 pesos, for stipends to the Church, salaries of the judges of the Audiencia and other officials, pay for the infantry, aid of Ternate and Formosa, the naval storehouse in Cavite, expenses of the fleet and the embassy to China, shipbuilding expenses, etc. The shortfall was made up for through forced loans, deferred payment of salaries, and sending much of the infantry on an overseas voyage for eight months.

The bridge over the Pasig River was completed after several years construction. This bridge and the Chinese hospital were charged to the general fund of the Chinese residents.

Niño de Tabora died in Manila on July 22, 1632. The Audiencia, with which the governor had rather unfriendly relations, took over the government of the colony until the arrival of the new governor Juan Cerezo de Salamanca in 1633.

== See also ==
- Spanish East Indies
- Spanish Filipino
- Philippine Spanish
- Chavacano
- Captaincy General of the Philippines
- Intramuros Grand Marian Procession
- Gates of Intramuros
- Fort Santiago

Political offices
Preceded by Fernándo de Silva	Spanish Governor-General of the Philippines; 1626–1632	Succeeded by Audiencia Real
