= Juan de Silva =

Spanish military commander and governor of the Philippines

14th Governor-General of the Philippines
- In office April 1609 – April 19, 1616
- Monarch: Philip III of Spain
- Governor: (Viceroy of New Spain); Luis de Velasco, 1st Marquess of Salinas; García Guerra; Pedro Otárola; Diego Fernández de Córdoba, 1st Marquess of Guadalcázar
- Preceded by: Rodrigo de Vivero y Aberrucia
- Succeeded by: Andrés de Alcaraz

Personal details
- Died: April 19, 1616

Juan de Silva (died April 19, 1616 in Malacca) was a Spanish military commander and governor of the Philippines, from April 1609 until his death on April 19, 1616.

De Silva was a native of Trujillo, Spain, and a knight of the Order of Santiago. He arrived in the Philippines as governor and captain general at Easter, 1609, bring with him five companies of reinforcements for the Spanish military in the colony. He developed a reputation for bravery and determination in his fight with the Dutch in the Far East.

== Defeat of the Dutch at Manila ==
On December 22, 1607 a Dutch fleet of the Company of the East Indies set sail from Texel to attack the Portuguese fleet and forts in the East. The fleet consisted of 13 vessels, 225 artillery pieces and more than 2,800 men. It was under the command of Admiral Pierre Willemsz., with François de Wittert as vice-admiral. The fleet fought with the Portuguese in Mozambique, Sumatra and Johore before building a fort at Near, in the Banda Islands (present-day Indonesia). Here on May 22, 1609 the admiral and some of his officers were killed in an attack by the natives, and Wittert assumed command.

Thereafter Wittert sailed to Manila to attack the Spanish there. (Spain and Portugal were ruled by the same king, Philip III of Spain (Philip II of Portugal), and thus were allies.) Wittert besieged Manila for five months, beginning in 1609. However, on April 24 or April 25, 1610, while supervising the unloading of junks, Wittert was surprised by at least 12 Spanish ships. His flagship, the Amsterdam, was captured after a lengthy fight, and the admiral was killed. Two ships apparently escaped, but the Spanish killed at least 85 Dutch and took 120 or more prisoners.

Also during the first part of Governor de Silva's term, the fourth archbishop of Manila, Diego Vazquez de Mercado, arrived there (June 4, 1610).

== Expeditions to the Moluccas ==
De Silva sent an unsuccessful expedition against the Dutch in the Moluccas in 1611, although the expedition did take Sabougo on Gilolo and establish a fort there. De Silva intended to secure Portuguese help to expel the Dutch from the area once and for all. To this end in 1612 he dispatched the former governor of Ternate, Cristobal de Azcueta to Portuguese India to make plans with the viceroy there for a joint assault. However Azcueta and the entire expedition were lost in a shipwreck between Manila and Macao.

De Silva tried again, this time sending two Jesuit emissaries to Goa. They arrived in 1615 and reached an agreement with the Portuguese viceroy that he would contribute four large galleons, to be sent to Malacca. This information was received in Manila, where a large Spanish fleet was already prepared, in July 1615. In order to obtain the artillery for this expedition de Silva had weakened the defenses of Manila, with grave risks in the event of an attack on the city by the Dutch.

There was no news of the arrival of the Portuguese galleons, but against the advice of many of his subordinates, Governor de Silva sailed for Malacca on February 9, 1616. He commanded ten galleons, four galleys and various smaller vessels. The flagship was the 1,700-ton San Marcos. The fleet carried 5,000 men, both soldiers and sailors, including nearly 2,000 Spaniards and a unit of Japanese infantry, which numbered at 500. It also carried 300 artillery pieces and 6 Jesuits. It was the largest European armada yet seen in the region.

The fleet sailed for the Strait of Malacca, with the intention of uniting with the expected Portuguese armada and then attacking the Dutch factory on Java and thereafter the Dutch bases on the islands of the Moluccas. But the Portuguese fleet had already been attacked by the Dutch near Malacca and completely destroyed. In order to avoid their capture, the Portuguese had burned their big galleons.

The Spanish fleet entered the Strait of Singapore on February 25, 1616. From there Governor de Silva sent Juan Gutierrez Paramo with part of the fleet to reinforce Ternate (in the Moluccas).

But the governor was in poor health. He had earlier asked several times to be relieved of office for health reasons. Now his health deteriorated further, and on April 19, 1616, he died in Malacca. The whole Spanish enterprise had to be abandoned, with nothing accomplished against the Dutch.

The armada returned to Manila on June 1, 1616, sin gente (without people). Although they had not faced combat, many men had died of fevers and other illnesses that struck the fleet in Malacca and the Strait of Singapore.

Critics of the governor, both among his contemporaries and later historians, have claimed that had he sailed directly to the Moluccas rather than to Malacca, he very possibly could have dislodged the undermanned Dutch from the archipelago.

== After his death ==
The Audiencia of Manila took charge of political affairs in the absence of Juan de Silva. Jerónimo de Silva, an uncle of the governor, was made interim governor by a royal decree in March 1616. The Audiencia governed until June or July, 1618, when the new governor, Alonso Fajardo y Tenza arrived and took up office.

Political offices
Preceded by The Count of Valle de Orizaba	Spanish Governor-General of the Philippines; 1609–1616	Succeeded by Alonso Fajardo y Tenza
