= Spanish occupation of Jolo (1638) =

- Part of Spanish–Moro conflict
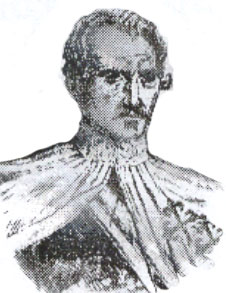
- Sebastián Hurtado de Corcuera, 44th Spanish Governor-General of the Philippines
| Date | January 4, 1638 – April 14, 1646 |
| Location | Bauang (Jolo), Sulu Sultanate |
| Result | Temporary Spanish occupation of Jolo and withdrawal in 1646 |

Belligerents
| Spanish Empire: Captaincy General of the Philippines | Sulu Sultanate; Dutch Republic (1644) |

Commanders and leaders
| Sebastián Hurtado de Corcuera | Sultan Muwallil Wasit; Pangiran Salikula; Sultan Nasir ud-Din |

Strength
| About 2,000 troops ~1,500 Cebuano auxiliaries 500 Spanish troops 80 Ships | 4,000 troops from Jolo, Borneo, Makassar; 1 Kuta (Fort); Unknown number of Dutch Navy vessels |

The Spanish occupation of Jolo or Battle of Jolo was a military expedition in the 1630s to pacify the Moro of the Sulu Sultanate. The expedition, personally led by Sebastian de Corcuera, the then Governor-General of the Spanish East Indies was a follow-up expedition to the earlier successful campaigns against the Maguindanao Sultanate under Sultan Qudarat. It was initially successful, partly due to an epidemic within the Sultan Wasit's fort early in the campaign, resulting in the Sulu forces retreating to Tawi-Tawi.

The occupation of Jolo also saw the installment of a short-lived Spanish garrison in the town. Later on, Sultan Wasit and Sultan Nasir ud-Din, who many believe to be Sultan Qudarat, began a series of expeditions against the Spaniards, successfully diminishing the garrison until they were called back to Manila in defense against a rumored attack by Chinese pirate Koxinga. After the occupation, a short period of peace followed, with no significant attacks made on Mindanao or Sulu. Corcuera's occupation was the first prolonged Spanish occupation of Jolo from 1638 to 1645.

== Background ==
The new Governor-General of the Philippines at the time, Governor Sebastian Hurtado de Corcuera intended to pacify the Moros of Mindanao once and for all, in order to consolidate and strengthen Spanish hold on the archipelago. This led to an initial Spanish invasion of Basilan, then known as Taguima, and a successful attack on Sultan Qudarat's base in Lamitan in 1636. Qudarat (sometimes spelled Kudarat) then focused on gathering support from the Maguindanao interior, regrouping for another attack, while dealing with the Spaniards diplomatically. After signing an agreement with Qudarat, a short interlude of 2 years occurred before Corcuera set out to Bauang, the then capital of the Sulu Sultanate, known to Spaniards as Jolo.

Meanwhile, within the walls of the Kuta or Fort of the Sultan Muwallil Wasit, known to the Spanish as Rajah Bungsu, news of the expeditionary force came just in time to make for preparations for the impending assault. Sultan Wasit called for all the Datu of Sulu along with allies from Borneo and Makassar to strengthen his Kuta. By the time the Spaniards sighted Jolo on 3 January, prior to making the attack, Wasit's Kuta boasted 4,000 troops and innumerable artillery pieces ready to repel the Spanish assault like it had done on numerous occasions before. Wasit also entered into an agreement with Maguindanao Sultan Kudarat to have an arranged marriage between one of Sultan Wasit's daughters and Kudarat. The importance of the resulting marriage and alliance will be discussed further later.

== The battle ==
=== Spanish Assaults ===
On January 4, 1638, the Spaniards landed on the beach near Jolo and staged their first assault on the fortress, with Corcuera himself leading the troops. Though the force came with much fury and with better arms compared to those in the fort, the attacks were repulsed. Bombardment of the fort continued for weeks after the initial assault, with the Sulus obstinate and holed up within the fort, while the Spanish-Filipino force regrouped on their ships. Another attack was led by Corcuera and the Sulus remained resistant. With either side gaining any ground, and the current siege situation favoring the Sultan, who had a steady supply of food from the interior of the island, a period of stalemate ensued.

=== Stalemate and Outbreak of disease in Jolo ===
After nearly 3 months of stalemate in Jolo, with neither side gaining or losing ground, and both sides suffering mounting casualties, it looked as though the Sulus had once again repelled the assault on their capital. But soon, a mysterious disease, described as a "tropical disease" (presumed to be malaria) entered the fort and ravaged its defenders. Many Sulus died from the sudden epidemic, and eventually, Sultan Wasit called for a retreat, abandoning the fort and the town and sailing to Dungun, Tawi-Tawi in the southernmost reach of the Sultanate. The Spaniards later occupied the town and fought off the remaining resistance in the fort, establishing a garrison within the town and reconstructing its Kutas and fortifications.

=== Counter attack by Sultan Wasit ===
After the initial triumph of the Spaniards in Jolo, Sultan Wasit was faced with a humiliating defeat at the hands of de Corcuera. Initial assaults on the town of Jolo were conducted by the Sulu Datus who were left behind, under the command of Wasit himself. However, no major assault occurred until presumably 1640. Regrouping and calling for reinforcements from Tawi-Tawi, he organized a counter-offensive to drive the Spaniards out of his domains.

However, he was not to directly lead this assault. The Datus of Sulu were now to be led by the Sultan's son, Pangiran Salikula. It was around this time that Salikula was named de facto Sultan of Sulu, due to his father's old age. It would take another 5 years of conflict before the Spaniards would agree to a treaty, and finally leave Jolo.

=== Battle of Bud Datu ===
The bulk of Wasit's army now consisted of the forces of his Datus, and the Datus of Tawi-Tawi, his Bornean and Makassarian allies either killed or captured. The fate of Jolo rested on the armies of the Datus and Sultan's army. The initial counterattack ended up pushing the front line to the mountain of Bud Datu, overlooking the then Spanish town of Jolo. for many months, the Datus of Sulu began fighting a bloody war in the jungles at the foot of the mountain, it became another stalemate for a while.

Soon, the battle began favoring the Sulus, as the garrison of the Spaniards was continually depleted, and Corcuera was absent at this time, attending to duties in Manila. Wasit was also no longer leading the Datus in battle, he was considered old and his son was entrusted with the command on the assault.

It is unclear how long this battle lasted, or how severe the casualties on either sides were, what is widely believed, however, is that Sultan Wasit ordered that the Mountain overlooking Jolo, was to be named "Bud Datu" meaning "Mountain of the Datu" to commemorate the sacrifice of the Datus of Sulu in their long fight with the Spaniards. The Datus of Sulu hunkered down and built their Kutas on the Mountain's slopes, in order to consolidate their minor gains.

=== Dutch involvement ===
On March 25, 1644, Wasit dispatched his Son, Pangiran Salikula, along with a Dutch fleet from Batavia to bombard the remaining Spaniards in the Jolo garrison. No decisive land battle occurred during this period, and the Dutch presumably had no further involvement with the Sulu Sultan afterwards. A period of relative peace once again ensued in Jolo, as the garrison was now cut off from reinforcements and virtually surrounded.

=== Final Sulu assault and destruction of Jolo garrison ===
Some time in 1645, the combined forces of Pangiran Salikula, the acting Sultan of Sulu and a certain Sultan Nasir ud-Din, who many believe to be Sultan Kudarat, led a final assault on the garrison, killing and capturing the remaining Spanish forces there and finally occupying Jolo.

=== Sultan Kudarat involvement ===
It is unclear what occurred between the Sulu reconquest of Jolo and the final treaty signed with Manila and Sulu. It is believed, however, that due to an earlier marriage agreement with Qudarat, or Nasir ud-Din, his presumed name in Sulu, Salikula would not continue to rule as de facto Sultan, or even reign as full Sultan in fact. Rather, Wasit is believed to have given the throne of Sulu to Nasir ud-Din as a gesture of gratitude and of obligation, as Nasir ud-Din was his son-in-law, due to an earlier marriage agreement between Sultan Wasit's daughter and Sultan Qudarat.

Sultan Qudarat was officially crowned Sulu Sultan Nasir ud-Din in Bauang or Jolo, sometime in late 1645, while Salikula and Wasit remained in Tawi-Tawi. On April 14, 1646, The Manila Spanish government signed a peace treaty with Sulu Sulta Nasir ud-Din recognizing the Sultanate's continuing independence from Spain, his sovereign rights to extend up to the Tawi-Tawi Group as far as Tup-Tup and Balabac islands in Palawan, and his monopoly on Maguindanao-Sulu-Borneo trade.

Sultan Nasir ud-Din ruled until 1648, when, after the death of Wasit's son, Salikula (sometimes spelled Sarikula) Wasit asserted his right to rule as Sultan once more, and Nasir ud-Din was asked to step down from the throne. However, Sultan Muwallil Wasit's second reign would be short lived, as he died around 1649 or 1650, giving way to his son, Pangiran Bakhtiar to become Sultan.

== Aftermath and legacy ==
Mindanao and Sulu would never be the same after de Corcuera stepped in, in his bid to pacify and unite the Philippine islands into a single nation-colony of Spain. His involvement in the Maguindanao interior led Qudarat and other Datus of Mindanao to begin regrouping and forming into a bigger political entity. For the first time in history, the Sultanate of Maguindanao could be recognized as an Islamic state and a united principality, with the combined rule of Buayan, Cotabato-Maguindanao under Qudarat, and the Lanao Sultans to form into one Nation.

A few years later, almost all troops in Mindanao were called back to Manila to defend it from an expected attack by the Chinese Pirate Koxinga. This allowed the Sultanates in the south to regroup and begin mobilizing their armies, as they were now undisturbed, due to the absence and abandonment of numerous forts, particularly that of Zamboanga. The attack by Koxinga never came and Mindanao experienced a period of relative peace and stability marked by increased trade and production, as well as military mobilization.

The impact on Sulu was also significant. Despite a long occupation of Jolo, and the epidemic that caused it, the Sultanate's prestige would grow as trade continued and Monopoly consolidated with the trade with Borneo and the Dutch. New wealth came pouring in and the Sultanate would eventually reach its apogee in the 18th century. However, the impact was also a negative one for Sulu, the war had damaged the main island's fields and a shortage of rice was evident, a problem Sulu would face well into the 19th century and beyond. Jolo may have been recaptured, but the Sultan and his court would not see Jolo again until the 1736 when the Court would be moved to Jolo from Tawi-Tawi.

The impact it had of the leaders of the war would also be profound. Sultan Muwallil Wasit was humiliated by his defeat by Corcuera and was never truly redeemed until his Son Sarikula fought off the Spaniards. He is remembered as a valiant hero of Sulu.

Salikula, the rightful heir to the throne of Sulu ruled for a mere 4 and a half years as a de facto Sultan, never truly experiencing powers of the full Sultan.

Sultan Qudarat would remain defiant against the Spaniards and would continue raiding the coasts of the Spanish Philippines, until his death at the age of 90, having ruled as Sultan of almost all of Mindanao, and as Sultan of Sulu.

Sebastian de Corcuera would not be welcomed as a hero in Manila, for he had made numerous enemies, particularly in the church, and his reputation as one of the most innovative and successful governors of the Philippines was soon erased from memory by the church, and his term ended in 1644. His career and campaigns in the Moro wars were among the most successful in the entire conflict. He managed to hold onto Jolo for 8 years, the first time in history that Spaniards occupied Jolo for a prolonged period of time. His expeditions to pacify the Moros also gave rise to various comic plays throughout the archipelago, depicting his fights with the Moros, these comical plays would become an integral part of Philippine culture and arts as the "Moro-moro" or "Moros y Cristianos".

What did not change, however was that almost all the Kingdoms in the south of the Philippines remained independent and strong. Moro pirates continued to ravage and raid the coasts of the Philippines and no other Spanish military assault would come near the success of Corcuera, until the 19th century.
