= Spanish–Moro conflict =

Series of battles in the Philippines 1565–1898

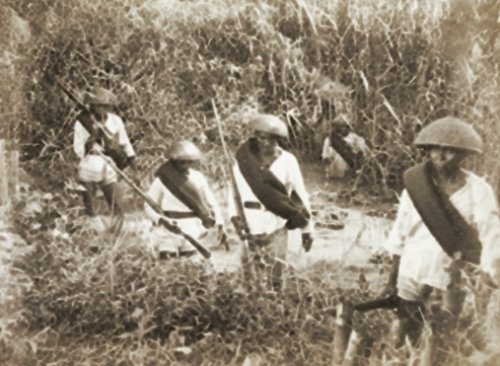
- Christian Filipinos, who served under the Spanish Army in Mindanao, searching for Moro rebels, c. 1887.
Date	1565–1898 (333 years)
Location	Zamboanga, Sulu, Mindanao, Visayas, Palawan
Result	In the Philippines: Inconclusive: Moro strategic Victory; Spain conquers portions of Mindanao and Jolo and imposes protectorate status over the Moros of Sulu.; Spain failed to completely subjugate Moros.; While Spain conquered portions of Mindanao, the Sulu Sultanate of Sulu submitted to protectorate status through Spain's extensive use of military resources.; Moro resistance against Spanish colonial authorities continue until the 1898 US capture of the Philippines.; The Moro war against American occupation begins.; In Borneo: Status quo ante bellum, withdrawal of both troops and the restoration of prewar leadership.

Belligerents
Spanish Empire: Captaincy General of the Philippines	Sulu Sultanate; Maguindanao Sultanate; Sultanates of Lanao; Sultanate of Ternate; VOC
Castilian War: Spanish Empire: Captaincy General of the Philippines Bruneian defectors	Castilian War: Brunei; Sulu Sultanate; Maguindanao

Commanders and leaders
Various Kings of Spain; Various Governors-General of the Philippines	Various Sultans of Sulu; Various Sultans of Maguindanao; Various Sultans of Lanao; Various Datus

Strength
Spanish and Christian Filipino soldiers	Moro fighters, Chinese rebels

The Spanish–Moro conflict (Spanish: Conflicto hispano-moro; Tagalog: Sagupaang Kastila at Moro, Labanang Kastila at Moro) was a series of battles in the Philippines lasting more than three centuries. It began during the Spanish Philippines and lasted until the Spanish–American War, when Spain finally began to subjugate the Moro people after centuries of attempts to do so. Spain ultimately conquered portions of the Mindanao and Jolo islands and turned the Sultanate of Sulu into a protectorate, establishing geographic dominance over the region until the Spanish-American War. Moro resistance continued.

== Wars during the 1600s ==
=== Background ===
The Spanish initiated the conflict by conquering the Philippines and invading Moro territory in an effort to subjugate the region to their rule in the 1500s. When the Spanish conquered Maynila, then a vassal of the Sultanate of Brunei, Rajah Sulayman resisted the Spanish. Manila became the capital of the Spanish Philippines after the conquest, with the Spanish converting people to Catholicism. The Spanish–Moro Wars started with the Castilian War, between Spaniards and the Sultanate of Brunei. (The term Moro at this time included Muslim Tagalogs who were ruled by the Sultanate of Brunei).

Following the reconquista, a period beginning about 720 AD during which Spanish Christian culture was restored to the areas of Spain invaded by the Umayyad Caliphate, the Inquisition required Jews and Muslims to convert to Roman Catholicism, or face exile or the death penalty. Thus, the Spaniards tried to suppress Islam in areas they conquered. To this end, they attacked the Moro Muslim sultanates in the south at Mindanao. The Moro datus and sultans raided and pillaged Spanish towns in the northern Philippine islands in retaliation for Spanish attacks and terrorized the Spanish invaders with constant piracy. The Spanish were prepared to conquer Mindanao and the Moluccas after establishing forts in 1635, but the Chinese threatened the Spanish with invasion, and they pulled back to defend Manila. Several thousand Chinese who were evicted by the Spanish joined the Moros.

Although the Spanish defeated the Sultanate of Brunei in 1578, they did not establish effective control over the Moro sultanates until the late 19th century. The Chinese dominated the economy of the Moro sultanates in the 19th century, controlling trading centers and the shipping trade between other parts of Southeast Asia and Mindanao. The Chinese sold weapons to the Moro sultanates during this time and the Spanish imposed a blockade to try to stop the supply of rifles from the Chinese to the Moros.

Though diminishing through the years, the Moros maintained their autonomy up to the Spanish–American War, after which they fought the Americans in a long insurgency.

In 1773, desiring to promote better relations between the Spaniards and the new sultan of Jolo, Anda proposed free trade and Spanish help to ensure no foreign powers established settlements in Moro territory without interference with the internal government of the sultan, but the Spanish officer failed to observe his instructions and nothing beneficial resulted except further irritation of the Moros. About 4,000 Chinese expelled from Manila in 1758 joined the Tausug Moros in Jolo.

=== Jihad against Spanish invasion ===
The followers of Moro declared a jihad against the Spanish and Filipino Christians, to defend themselves against the Spanish invaders who tried to take over Moro territory. The Moros retaliated with major pillaging campaigns and enslaved Filipino Christians after razing their villages. Several Moro sultans led these jihads. They defeated Spanish attempts to conquer Mindanao. The Spanish had used their massive numbers to force the Moros to withdraw.

A "culture of jihad" emerged among the Moros due to the centuries-long war against the Spanish invaders.

=== War against Lanao ===
Christianized Filipinos were used by the Spanish to invade the Maranao territory and other Muslim tribes in the Philippines. The Spanish colonial forces launched military and spiritual campaigns against the Maranao people at Lake Lanao. On April 4, 1639, Spanish conquistador Sebastián Hurtado de Corcuera sent the first expedition, which included Spaniards and Boholano troops. This campaign was led by Captain Francisco de Atienza and Fray Agustin de San Pedro, who formed alliances with some local chiefs. In 1640, Don Pedro Bermudes Castro established a garrison, but the Maranaos, feeling threatened, fought back, driving the Spaniards out and destroying their installations, leading to over 250 years without Spanish presence in the area.

=== War with Buayan under Rajah Silongan ===
In April 1596, Rajah Silongan held off against the joint forces of Maguindanao and Spain, eventually subordinating the Sultan of Maguindanao, Kapitan Laut Buisan, and form a confederacy that composed of Buayan, Cotabato, and Tamontaca.

In 1599, Rajah Silongan, accompanied by 3000 Buayan Moros, joined forces with Datu Salikula of Maguindanao and assaulted the coast communities of Cebu, Negros, and Panay, inflicting many atrocities. A huge force tried a repeat in 1600 but was repelled in southern Panay. In 1602, the Sultan of Buayan invaded Batangas but was repelled at Balayan. They also invaded Calamianes and gained 700 captives. In 1603, Buayan attacked Leyte.

In 1605, a peace treaty negotiated by Melchor Hurtado was signed between Maguindanao, Buayan and Spain. On 8 September 1605, Spain and Buayan signed an agreement to recognize Rajah Silongan as the paramount ruler of Maguindanao in exchange for his allegiance to Spain. This was done as a divisive measure to encourage strife between Maguindanao and Buayan. Eventually, Kapitan Laut Buisan of Cotabato would distance himself from Rajah Silongan and establish his own community on the coast.

On 22 July 1609, after the leaders of Buayan learned of the Spanish capture of Ternate, Rajah Silongan and Kapitan Laut Buisan sent a letter to the Spanish governor-general in Manila to ask for forgiveness for their previous alliance with the Sultanate of Ternate. In 1619, the Sultanate of Buayan faced a decline due to the rise of Sultan Muhammad Kudarat of Maguindanao. Eventually, by 1634, the confederacy headed by Rajah Silongan disappeared. He was reduced into a petty king.

=== Chinese threat to the Spanish and 1663 Chinese rebellion ===
The Spanish built a fort called Real Fuerza de San Jose in Zamboanga under Captain Juan de Chavez in 1635 who led a Christian Spanish Filipino army. Construction started on June 23 of that year. In 1637 Corcuero inaugurated a new conquest of Jolo and of Mindanao. His force consisted of 76 Europeans. He made a landing at Jolo. The following year, he landed at Zamboanga and proceeded past Cattobats up the Rio Grande against the Datu Corralat and the Datus of Buhayen and Basilan. The following year, Corcuero and Almonte built a fort at Sabonilla, now called Malabang, on Plana Bay. During 1639, Spanish soldiers and priests, under the warlike Recoleto friar, Augustin de San Pedro, led a party of 560 against the Lanao Moros, where Camps Vicars and Keithley now stand. In 1642, Generals Corcuero and Almonte made peace with Corralat, but piratical depredations by the Moros continued.

The Spanish and the Moros had signed the Jolo treaty to stop hostilities decades before renewed Spanish-Moro hostilities. Despite the Jolo treaty, the Jolo datu, Salicala, and a datu from Borneo ravaged the Visayan coast. The force of the latter was defeated by Monforte near Masbate, and Salicala returned to Jolo. Monforte destroyed several towns and 300 boats in Borneo. In 1655 trouble again broke out between Corralat (Kudarat) and the Spanish forces, the Moros sacking numerous towns in the Calamianes and one town near Zamboanga. In 1656 a fleet dispatched by De Sara, the new captain-general, burned Corralat's town and some Moro towns in Sibuguey Bay, destroying also a Dutch fleet allied with the Moros. The Moros at the same time were ravaging the coasts of Mindoro and Marinduque, and succeeded also in repulsing the attack on the fort at Corralat (this may refer to Cotabato, the homeland of Sultan Kudarat), forcing the Spaniards to return to Sabonilla and Zamboanga. In 1657 Salicala scoured the Philippine seas, capturing over 1,000 native prisoners, entering the Bay of Manila during the raid. In 1660 Moros from Jolo and Tawi-Tawi, taking advantage of an insurrection in Luzon, raided the coasts of Bohol, Leyte, and Mindoro.

Throughout 1656, 1657, 1660, and 1662, the Moros attacked and pillaged towns on Spanish-controlled islands, sailing around the area in order to raid. They defeated Spanish attempts to take the fort of Sultan Kudarat. The Spanish Governor General Sebastian Hurtado de Corcuera brought soldiers from Peru and Mexico and had defeated the Moro Sultan Kudarat and built forts in Moro territory in Zamboanga, reversing previous Moro successes. The people of Manila were celebrating the victories of the Spanish.

While Governor-General Lara was in office another Chinese invasion threatened, led by a Ming loyalist named Koxinga who had been driven forth from his own country (Ming Dynasty) by the Qing. When the Manchus overran China, about the middle of the seventeenth century, Koxinga and many of his followers refused to submit. Koxinga raised a pirate army, went to Formosa, drove out the Dutch people, and settled there. Later Koxinga laid a plan to take the Philippine Islands and set up his kingdom there.

Koxinga's chief adviser was an Italian friar and Dominican missionary, who had been living in the province of Fukien, named Riccio. This friar he had appointed a high mandarin, or nobleman. In the spring of 1662, he now sent him to Manila and dispatched him as an ambassador to the governor of the Philippines, dressed in the garb of his office, to demand tribute from the Philippine government and to threaten an attack on Manila if Koxinga’s demands were not met.

Naturally this demand caused amazement and alarm in Manila. No such danger had threatened the Spanish in the Philippines since the invasion of Limahong. The Chinese conqueror had an innumerable army, and his armament, stores, and navy had been greatly augmented by the surrender of the Dutch. The colony was weak and unprepared for defense, and consequently terrified.

The Spaniards were aghast at the idea of a Catholic priest demanding tribute from a Catholic country, in the name of a heathen ruler. Later the authorities at Rome called the friar to account for his conduct. At this time, however, the Spanish were at a loss how to act. They did not dare send the priest-mandarin away, nor could they give him any answer. They therefore kept him waiting in Manila while they made up their minds what to do.

As was usual, when trouble arose, the government thought that the Chinese in Manila were plotting to take the city. There were 25,000 Chinese living in Pari-an, north of the Pasig River, in Manila. They felt sure that these men would be ready to help Koxinga when he came, so everything was made ready for another attack upon the Chinese in Luzon. All government troops, both Spanish and native, were collected at Manila. So great was the fear, that three important forts were torn down, and the soldiers stationed there were brought to Luzon. Only the fort at Caraga, Mindanao, was left standing. This one they did not dare to give up; the soldiers there were all that kept the Moros from destroying the settlements on that coast.

The Spanish proceeded to order all Chinese to leave the Philippines. The Chinese suspected that the Spanish planned to massacre them, so the Chinese rebelled and assaulted Manila to fight the Spanish and Filipinos. The Chinese either died in battle or, escaping by frail boats, joined the Chinese colonists on Formosa. The Spanish razed their own churches and convents in Manila to prevent Chinese from taking shelter in them. A massacre of the Chinese by the Spanish and Filipinos followed during the rebellion. About 5,000 Chinese remained in Manila after the rebellion and massacre. The massacre cost the lives of 22,000 of the Chinese; the remaining 3,000 built frail boats and fled to Formosa. Another account says that 5,000 Chinese remained in Manila after the rebellion and massacre. The foolish attack upon the Chinese took so many Spanish soldiers from the southern islands that the Moros now had free swing along the coasts of Mindanao and the Visayas. Several datus from the Jolo and Tawi-Tawi islands also sacked and burned many towns in the Visayas.

In 1662, Koxinga's Chinese forces raided several towns in the Philippines. The Spanish refused to pay the tribute.

After peace was made, Riccio was allowed to return to Formosa, to inform Koxinga what had been done. He found the chieftain getting ready to come to Manila with an army to take the country, and Riccio told him what had happened. Koxinga's rage was great when he heard his mandarin's story. He planned to go at once to the islands to punish this wicked cruelty to his countrymen. He fell ill, however, and died of fever before he could start. Thus Manila escaped the fate that must almost surely have fallen upon the city if the Chinese chief and his great army had reached the bay. Koxinga's son did not take up the task of invading the Philippines after Koxinga's death.

The effects of the events cited above left Spanish prestige at a low ebb. Manila was no longer the principal commercial centre of the East and never again recovered that position. The century that followed from 1663–1762 has been described as one of obscurity for the Philippines.

Koxinga's threat to invade the Philippines and expel the Spanish resulted in the Spanish failure to conquer the Islamic Moro people in Mindanao. The Spanish retreated from Mindanao in 1663 after the Chinese threat against Manila. The Chinese threat effectively destroyed the Spanish plan to conquer and colonize the Moros in Zamboanga. Bobadilla, governor of Zamboanga, was ordered to evacuate Zamboanga, which was done in January 1663. Governor Sebastian Manrique de Lara also conducted the evacuations. Iligan was also given up by the Spanish. After this, the Moros essentially had a free rein to attack the Spanish. The Sulu Sultanate was also saved due to Koxinga, the Spanish had left La Caldera Fort.

For the next half century Moro raids on the Mindanao and Visayan settlements marked each year, and many fights were chronicled between the fleets of prahus and the Spanish fleet known as the "Armada de los Pintados". Moro raids also occasionally reached Luzon as well.

The Jesuits had endeavored in 1666 and 1672 to have the fort of Zamboanga rebuilt, but it was not until 1712 that the Spanish king ordered its reestablishment, and even then the project was not realized until 1718.

=== Slave trade ===
The Spanish-Moro wars resulted in the expansion of the transpacific Spanish slave trade. Spanish troops, acting very similarly to the Moorish pirates, would capture and forcibly convert Muslims to Christianity, then ship them to Spanish colonies in the new world. According to Iberian law, the enslavement of Muslims who opposed the spread of Catholicism were permitted to be enslaved, and as Hernando Ríos Coronel argued, making slave raids on the Islamic sultanates and allowing their allies to do so would allow the Spanish to tap into the lucrative slave economies as well as allowing more of the Catholic Luzon men to be free to fight alongside the Spaniards. This proposal was quickly approved by the Crown, and was put into practice against the Muslims of Mindanao.

== Wars in the 1700s ==
In 1662, a Chinese rebellion embarrassed the Spaniards, and at this time several datus from the Jolo and Tawi-Tawi islands sacked and burned a great many towns in the Visayas. Following these inroads, Bobadilla, governor of Zamboanga, was ordered to evacuate that station, which was done in January, 1663.

For the next half century Moro raids on the Mindanao and Visayan settlements marked each year, and many fights were chronicled between the fleets of praus and the Spanish fleet known as the "Armada de los Pintados".

The Jesuits had endeavored in 1666 and 1672 to have the fort of Zamboanga rebuilt, but it was not until 1712 that the Spanish King ordered its reestablishment, and even then the project was not realized until 1718, in which year the present fort, with four bastions, was built and the city walls protected. The place was defended by 61 pieces of artillery. The reestablishment of the Zamboanga station caused great discontent among the Moros. It was besieged for two months in 1720 and 1721 by 5,000 Moros under the datu of Butig. The resistance, directed by the governor, Amorrea, was successful, and the siege abandoned, the Moros turning their efforts to raids on Mindoro and the Calamianes, where great damage was done.

In 1724, the Jolo sultan made a treaty of peace with the Spaniards, ceding the island of Basilan. But this same year Manaol, in Mindoro, and Cateel, in Mindanao, were attacked. In 1730 Tay-Tay was sacked and burned by Tawi-Tawi Moros. and the fort at that place unsuccessfully attacked. In 1731 a punitive expedition was sent to Jolo and a number of Moro towns destroyed. In 1734 the Tawi-Tawi Moros attacked and nearly succeeded in capturing Zamboanga. In the same year, and again in 1735, Tay-Tay was again attacked, but the Moros were severely punished in these engagements. In the same year another surprise was attempted at Zamboanga. These actions were supplemented by numerous minor engagements, and were temporarily terminated by a new peace treaty in 1737 with the new sultan of Jolo.

In 1746, letters from King Philip V, addressed to the sultans of Jolo and Tamontaca (Mindanao), requesting that the Christian religion be allowed to be preached in their domains, were received, and upon sending embassies to the sultans the project was apparently well received. In 1748 two Jesuit priests took their station at Jolo, but on account of a family quarrel Bantilan. brother of the Sultan, proclaimed himself as ruler of Jolo during the absence of the sultan at Zamboanga. The deposed Sultan came to Manila in 1749, and in 1750 professed a desire to become a Christian. The archbishop of Manila did not believe in his sincerity, but he was baptized at Paniqui, in another diocese. In 1751, the sultan returned to Jolo, escorted by a Spanish force under Antonio de Abad, with the intention of overthrowing Bantilan. The expedition was unsuccessful and returned to Zamboanga. In the meantime a letter was intercepted from the Sultan of Sulu to the Sultan of Mindanao, and its contents established the infidelity and disloyalty of the Sultan Ali Mudin. He, his family, and his followers, numbering over 200, were imprisoned in Manila and Cavite, and a second expedition was sent against Jolo without result.

During the succeeding two years the Jolo Moros were unmerciful in their raids, which were most extensive. Paragua. Leyte, the north coast of Mindanao, Romblon, Tayabas, Ticao. Mindoro, Culion. and the Calamianes suffered severely. Two towns in Zambales Province were reached by the Moros. In 1754, the raids were repeated in Mindoro, Leyte, and Mindanao, and extended to Cebu. Negros, and Panay; this year Albay and Batangas provinces also were reached. The Spanish had success in these years. In 1753 a fleet of 150 praus was destroyed, with about 2,000 Moros, and 500 captives liberated. In 1756, the fort at Misamis was constructed. In the same year, it was reported that 2,500 Moros were killed in an attack on a Spanish galley off Batangas. In 1757, the Moros burned the town of Mariveles, in Manila Bay, as well as several towns in the southern islands and the Calamianes, but lost a fleet from Tuboc in an encounter with Spanish galleys.

During these five years the Moro attacks were so persistent and successful that in many of the Visayan towns 50 percent of the inhabitants were killed or enslaved.

In 1762, the British captured Manila, and, due to this and the rising of the natives of the northern provinces, the Moros renewed their attacks on the southern islands. Continuing for several years, they sacked and burned towns in Sorsogon, Tablas, Sibnyan, Mindoro, Bataan, and Leyte, and in Surigao and Misamis provinces in Mindanao. Even Manila suffered from the raids during this period, 20 captives being secured in Malate. Malabon and Paranaque were also attacked.

In 1771, de Anda, the new captain-general, reorganized the Armada de los Pintados, but the incursions continued. In this year a Spanish friar was captured by a Moro fleet at Aparri, Cagayan. About this time Israel, the son of Ali Mudin, was established in the sultanate of Jolo by the British.

In 1773, Anda, desiring to promote better relations between the Spaniards and the new sultan of Jolo, proposed free trade and Spanish help to ensure no foreign power established settlements in Moro territory without interference with the internal government of the sultan, but the Spanish officer failed to observe his instructions and nothing beneficial resulted, save further irritation of the Moros. About 4.000 Chinese expelled from Manila in 1758 joined the Jolo Moros; also a number of Englishmen, the leader of whom, named Brun, was put in charge of the defense. In 1775 the Moros destroyed the British settlement on Balambangan, led by the datu, Teteng, who later in the year made an attempt against Zamboanga and, upon its being frustrated, committed great ravages upon the coast of Cebu, and continued this for two years. From 1776 to 1778, during the rule of Governor Pedro Sarrio, the Moros harassed the coast as never before. At this time the Sultan Israel, of Jolo was poisoned by AH Mudin, his cousin. In 1778 the " Light Fleet" dislodged the Moros from their fort at Mamburao, Mindoro, and traffic between Luzon and the southern islands, which had been practically paralyzed for ten years, began to revive. The Sultan of Jolo asked for peace in 1781. Also in 1781, the Mindanao Moros invaded the Visayan Islands, but were defeated.

In 1785, the Moros burned several towns in the Visayas and captured a prau in Bulacan Province, near Manila.

In 1789, the captain-general, Mariquina, informed the King that constant war with the Moros was an evil without remedy. The governor of Iloilo reported more than 400 persons made captives in two towns. In 1792 Boljoon in Cebu and another town in Leyte were burned and 120 of the inhabitants made prisoners. In 1794 expeditions visited Mindoro. and the Jolo Moros became more peaceful, but the Illanaos, living on the bay of Tubug, in Mindanao, and the natives of Tampassooc, on the west coast of Borneo, made constant raids, not only in the Philippines, but also upon the Dutch islands of Banca and Malacca. In 1794 Siroma, in the Camarines, was attacked and many natives of Daet, in the same province, were carried off.

In 1796, the shipyard of San Bias. Mexico, was transferred to Cavite for building the vessels required in the Moro campaigns. From this resulted the naval arsenal at Cavite.

In 1796, the naval lieutenant, Arcillos, was captured and put to death at Sibuguey, and the next year Caraga was attacked by the Moros.

In 1798, five hundred Moros, with twenty-five praus, fell upon Baler, Casiguran, and Palanan, east coast of Luzon, capturing 450 people. The headquarters of the pirates for years was on Burias Island, from whence they descended upon the neighboring towns. The Spanish ship San Jose was also captured at Tawi-Tawi by the brother of the Sultan of Jolo. and part of its crew sacrificed.

In 1803, the Moros had so ravaged Mindoro that the greater part of the people abandoned the towns for the mountains.

In 1793 to 1794, no headway was made against the pirates, while some of their boats made a landing on the coast of Zambales, north of Manila Bay, and escaped without loss.

At a meeting of the authorities in Manila and persons of the southern islands, it was shown that each year the Moros captured and enslaved about 500 persons.

The expenses from 1778 to the end of 1793 amounted to 1,519,209 pesos fuertes. Six divisions were formed, each of six gunboats and one "panco" or prau, and the forts of the Visayas, Mindoro, Tayabas, Batangas, and Zamboanga were repaired. Privateering against the Moros was also made permanent.

== Wars in the 1800s ==
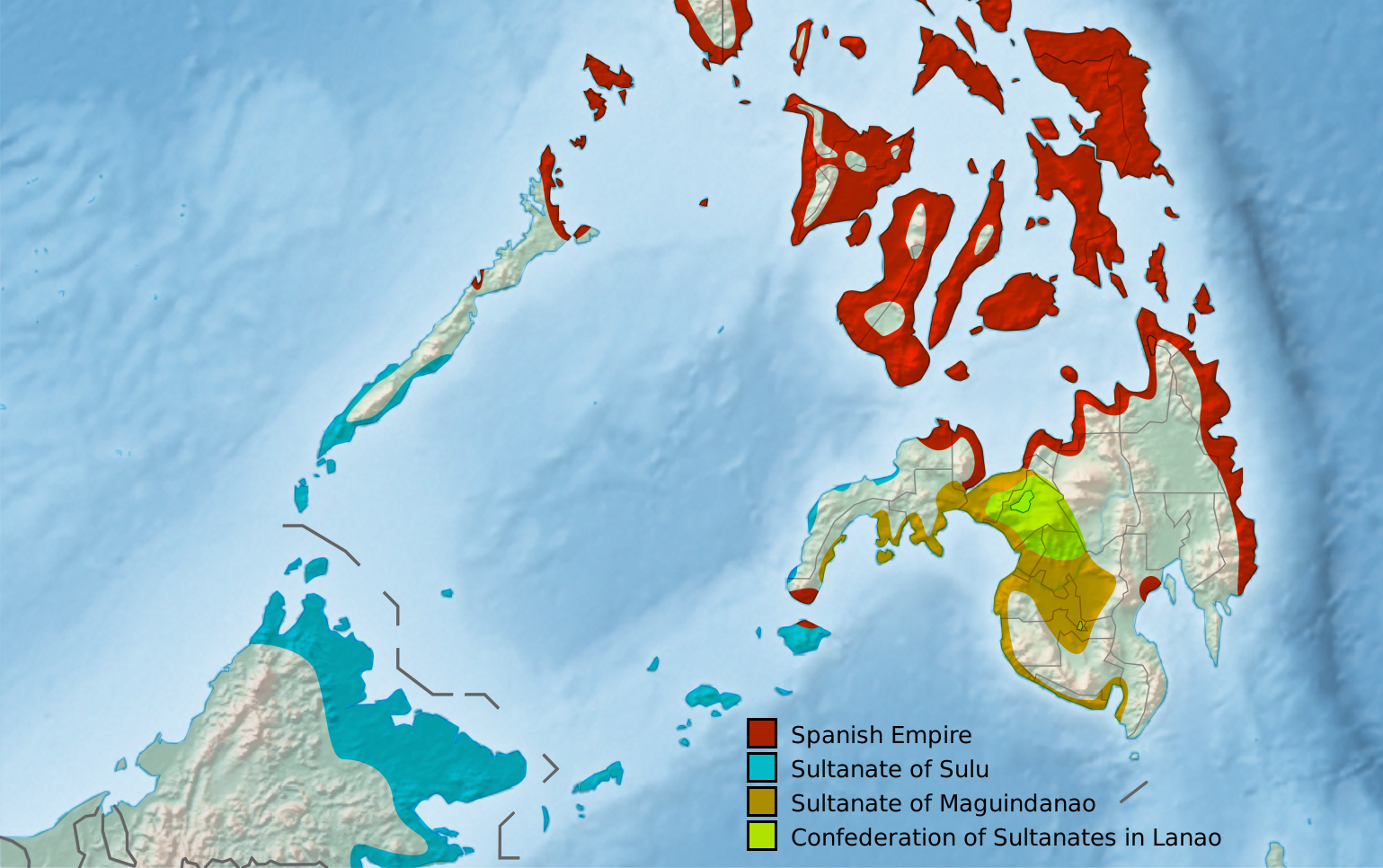
Map of the approximate extents of the Moro Sultanates in Mindanao in the late 19th century, showing the Sultanate of Sulu, Sultanate of Maguindanao, and the Confederation of Sultanates in Lanao.

In 1805 a treaty was made between the Sultan of Jolo and the Spanish Government whereby it was agreed that no foreign resident would be permitted in Sulu without the consent of the Spanish Government, and that in case of war between Spain and any foreign country the Sultan's ports would be closed against Spain's enemies. From 1806 to 1815 detailed accounts of piratical raids are infrequent.

In 1813 a royal order incorporated the privateer fleet of the Philippines with the royal fleet. In 1815 the raiders took 1,000 native prisoners and captured several Spanish, British, and Dutch vessels. In 1818 twenty-three Moro praus were captured or destroyed in a naval action off the coast of Albay. but later attacks were made by pirates upon Catanduanes Island and some towns of Albay and Camarines.

In 1824, at Pilas. 21 miles west of Basilan. a Moro fort was taken, and severe losses inflicted upon its defenders, among the dead lying the Datu Ipoypo, called "the lash of the Visayas," who each year had carried off more than 500 persons. The expedition also destroyed piratical boats at Jolo, Illana Bay, Polloc, and other parts of Mindanao.

From 1827 to 1835 the records respecting Moro conflicts are meager. In 1836, under Salazar, a treaty (mainly commercial) was made with the Sultan of Jolo. In this same year hostile Moros were dislodged from Masbate.

In 1842 a fort was erected in Basilan. In April 1843, a convention between the Sultan and the French emissary was made. It stipulated for equal rights of trade between the French and Joloan ports, and a later treaty, dated February 20, 1845, ceded the island of Basilan to Franco for the sum of 100,000 pesos. In 1844 the French war ship Sabine arrived at Zamboanga, and the commander notified the Spanish governor, Figueroa, that he had come to investigate the capture of some of his crew by the Maluso Moros: and later three other French vessels, under Vice-Admiral Cecille, arrived and blockaded the island of Basilan, the offender being the Datu Usak. A Spanish force under Bocalan went immediately to Zamboanga, and soon the French raised the blockade. A Spanish fort was built at Pagsanjan, Basilan. Later the Davao country was ceded to the Spaniards by the Sultan of Mindanao. The Davao settlement was made by Jose Oyanguren, who, in 1849, took the fort of Hi jo.

In 1845 a Spanish frigate left Manila for Zamboanga, and from there proceeded to the island of Balanguingui, of the Samales group, where an anchorage was made at the principal port. Colonel Penaranda, secretary to the civil governor of the Philippines, tried to communicate with the datu of the island, but in place of this was ordered to leave at once, and the Moro fort fired upon the Spanish frigate. A landing was made, but the party was obliged to retire with the loss of some men and Commander Rodriguez. At this time this island was the center of piracy in the archipelago, and the visit of the Spanish vessel was to ascertain its means of defense.

In 1848 the British-built steam gunboats El Cano, Magallanes, and Reina de Castilla, with three barkentines, carrying three companies of troops, went to Balanguingui, which was still a center of piracy. The expedition, headed by Claveria in person, anchored off Balanguingui, and an attack was made. After a cannonade from the vessels, three companies and 150 Zamboanga volunteers assaulted the walls and carried the fort after a desperate resistance, the Moros losing 100 killed. The Spanish lost 7 killed and 50 wounded. The next day another fort was captured in the same manner. 340 Moros being killed and 150, mostly women and children, being taken prisoners. The Spaniards lost 1 officer and 15 men killed, 224 wounded, and 22 contused. Seventy-nine pieces of artillery were captured in the two forts and 30 captives rescued. Two smaller forts were also taken, and the towns of Buasugan, Suitan, Pahat, and Padanan destroyed.

In 1848 two Dutch corvettes, being denied the return of some captives by the Sultan of Jolo, cannonaded the forts there for twenty-four hours.

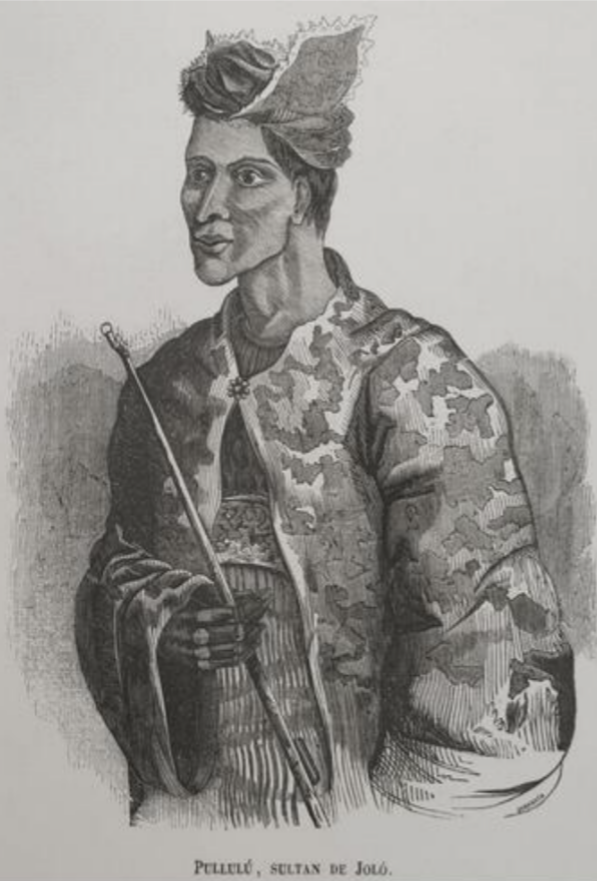
Mohammad Pulalun Kiram, sultan of Sulu from 1844 to 1862, who accepted the treaty by Sir James Brooke

In 1849 the British warship HMS Meander, Captain Kepple, with Sir James Brooke, the founder of Sarawak, on board, made a treaty with the Sultan of Jolo in which the Sultan promised not to recognize any other power as his suzerain without the consent of Great Britain. Later in 1849, 3,000 Moros from Jolo attacked the fort of Isabela de Basilan, but were repulsed. The prisoners taken were conducted to Zamboanga and a notice was sent to the Sultan of Jolo concerning the capture and punishment of his subjects.

A Moro fleet from Tonquil, together with some praus, in 1850, raided the islands of Samar and Camiguin, carrying off 75 natives. The old and the children were thrown overboard as useless. A Spanish fleet then went to Jolo. The place was defended by five cotas or forts. It was also fortified by a wall and was well supplied with cannon. The population numbered some 7,000 people, of whom 500 were Chinese. Two officers sent to arrange an interview were fired upon by Moros after embarking. The place was deemed to be too strong for attack by the force present and the Spanish commander decided to return and await reinforcements: but the forts, without notice, opened a general fire upon the fleet at anchor, killing 7 and wounding 4 sailors. The fleet replied, but soon returned to Zamboanga.

The El Cano was sent to Manila with the news. Reinforcements arrived and the expedition returned to Jolo, capturing the place after a spirited action. The Spanish lost 3 killed and 92 wounded, while the Moros had 300 killed and lost over 100 cannon.

The fall of Jolo was not without effect. Numerous small expeditions to various Mindanao datus and sultans were well received. In April 1850, the governor of Zamboanga went to Jolo, and on the 19th the Spanish flag was raised. The same day, in a treaty, the Sultan acknowledged the sovereignty of Spain, and agreed not to make treaties, conventions, and alliances with European powers, companies, persons, corporations, nor with any sultan or chief, and all treaties previously made with other powers were declared null and void. The Sultan also agreed to use no flag but that of Spain, and the Spanish governor guaranteed to respect the religion of the Moros. Piracy was also declared to be prohibited. A salary of 1,500 pesos was allowed to the Sultan, 600 pesos to 3 datus, and 360 pesos to the "sheriff" for his services to the Spanish Government. This treaty was dated and signed April 19, 1851.

Notwithstanding the promises of the Sultan, pirate vessels continued to scour the remote parts of the archipelago. Five small Spanish vessels encountered a Moro fleet of 4 praus on the southwest coast of Paragna. One of the Spanish vessels was blown up, but the pirates were defeated with a loss of 100 dead. The Spaniards lost 14 killed and 12 wounded, but rescued 20 captives from the Moros.

In 1852 a general rebellion broke out in Sugut near Polloc. The Spanish attacked the fort and killed 50 of the Moros.

In January 1854, a company of the Principe Regiment was ambushed in Basilan and nearly all killed. In this same year a town on Capul, near Jolo, was burned by the Spaniards from Basilan; but in 1855 the Moros from Sulu made a dash upon Zamboanga and burned the best part of the town.

In 1856 a Spanish expedition burned a town of Jolo for piracy, also one in the islands of Simisa and one on Basilan.

In 1857 the gunboat Reina de Castillo, 150 soldiers, and 50 Zamboanga volunteers destroyed 2 villages near Zamboanga. In 1858 General Norzagaray offered premiums to whomsoever should kill any pirate wherever found, but this was of no important result.

In this year the "light fleet" of Isabela de Basilan sailed for Simisa, where it surprised the Moros and after a hard fight put them to flight. Seventy-six captives were rescued and 116 prisoners taken, among them the families of two powerful datus. In view of the state of the island and the captivity of their people the two chiefs presented themselves at Basilan with 60 captives, one a priest and another a European woman, and in view of their submission the governor made an exchange of prisoners. In 1860 the Moros established themselves on the islands of Catanduanes and Biti and others belonging to the province of Albay, the governor of the province being unable to dislodge them. They also infested the straits of San Bernardino between Luzon and Samar, their number being between 400 and 500, where they killed some 16 persons, captured 10, and carried off a vessel. The same year two piratical datus of Dong-Dong in Tawi-Tawi were killed by Datu Alip and their heads were carried to Zamboanga. In 1860 the Moros attempted to seize a vessel lying at anchor at Tuluyan, and in the attempt 3 of them were killed. The Spanish officer wrote an arrogant letter to the Sultan demanding the return of 2 Spaniards and 200 natives within six days, and the Sultan acceding Bent 12 vessels to Tawi-Tawi to repress some of the pirate datus.

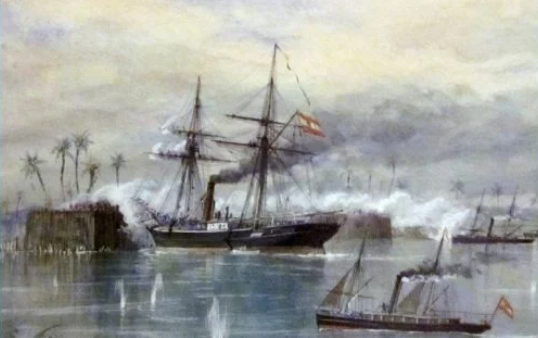
19th-century painting by Rafael Monleón depicting Spanish forces under Casto Méndez Núñez attacking a Moro fort on the Mindanao River at Pagalungan, 17 November 1861

In 1861, 18 steam gunboats were purchased in England, and it was due to these boats that the almost continued piracy which had existed up to that time was soon reduced to insignificance.

In 1862 Samales Moros made raids on the Zamboanga coast, but the raids ceased when a small gunboat sank a large prau with all of its crew. At the same time a small fleet forced the Sultan of Mindanao to hoist a Spanish flag at Polloc. The Moros met reverses in loss of fleets near Guimaras and Tugubanjan islands and in the destruction of the four towns Ponugan, Bugamputi, Patan, and Caneanga.

In September 1864 an expedition was sent from Polloc against the Rio Grande Moros, who had built defenses on that river from Cotabato to Tumbao. The fort at Pagalungan was captured, with a severe loss to the Moros. In the report of this assault honorable mention was made of Ensigns Cervera and Montijo, afterwards Spanish admirals. In this year the Talayan Moros were proceeded against, the Spanish being aided by a force under Datu Utto, son of the Sultan of Buhayan, but during the attack Uto joined the Talayan Moros, and the expedition failed. A second expedition also failed, and the outlying fort at Bongao was abandoned.

In 1866 the Moros of Supangan and Simuay rose in rebellion, and the governor of Mindanao, with a force and four gunboats, proceeded against the fortified towns of Supuangan, Dulugan, and Sanditan. The expedition was entirely successful, with but slight loss. In 1870 a raid was made by Tawi-Tawi Moros on the east coast of Paragua. The town of Santa Monica, or Batacalan, was destroyed and all of its inhabitants carried away. Two years later a garrison of native troops was placed at Puerto Princesa.

In this year a naval blockade of Jolo was established, and in 1873 two German vessels were seized while carrying contraband of war to the Jolo Moros. In 1874 this fleet did considerable damage to the Moros of the islands from Jolo to TawiTawi. Toward the close of the same year a large party of Moros attacked the garrison at Balabac, but were repulsed. In October 1875, two gunboats in search of Moro pirates located their headquarters in the Bay of Areray and sank one large prau.

These operations practically terminated the long term of piracy under which the colonies had suffered for three centuries. The mobility of the steam gunboats and the subsequent blockade against introduction of arms and ammunition had in a dozen years practically removed the menace, though occasionally raids appeared in the years to follow. Most of the trouble in the succeeding years, however, took the form of more or less extensive campaigns against the three large groups of Moros (Sulu, Rio Grande, and Lanao) in the control of the fanatical running amuck, called by the Spaniards juramentado.

=== Campaign of 1876 ===
The Spanish fleet signaling to open fire on the Moro fortifications during the military expedition against the Sultanate of Sulu in Jolo, 1876

In 1873, Spain had largely reorganized her Philippine forces, and in 1876 the forces included seven native regiments of infantry and one of artillery, two regiments of the civil guard, and some force of carbineers and marines. There were also troops at Balabac, Isabela de Basilan, and Cavite.

The relations between the Government and Di Amirul, the Sultan of Jolo, had been becoming more and more tense, and an extensive expedition was planned against the Sultan by the captain-general in 1876, in spite of Spain's political troubles at home and the depleted condition of the treasury. The projected expedition was received with great enthusiasm in the city of Manila and throughout Luzon, especially by the great religious orders. The fleet of 10 steamers leaving Manila early in February was reinforced at Zamboanga and proceeded with 11 additional transports and miscellaneous vessels under the escort of 12 gunboats to Bacungan, where anchorage was made on February 20. The captain-general was in command and was accompanied by the admiral in command of naval forces. On the 22d a landing was made at Paticolo, about a league northeast of Jolo, the fleet silencing the ineffectual Moro resistance. Malcampo, the captain-general, ordered a half brigade to remain at Paticolo with the engineer section and a mountain battery, with directions to march upon Jolo the following day in order to unite with the force which the captain-general would lead into the interior to flank the Moro stronghold. The plan proved nearly fatal to the turning column. It was lost in the thick woods and was unable, on a very hot day, to find water. The following afternoon, harassed by the Moros and nearly perishing from thirst, the column reached the shore at Tandu, where it united with that left at the beach, which had not been molested in the least.

The captain-general, loth to abandon his plan of attacking Jolo from the interior, finally decided to attack by the shore. The army advanced at daylight on the 29th, the fleet opening upon the forts at the same time. At 9 a heavy rain came on and lasted an hour, at the end of which time a brigade advanced against the forts of the datus Daniel and Ubico. The vanguard was led by the First Regiment, and the brigade commander was the first to set foot upon the enemy's works. After a sharp fight the forts were captured by the Spaniards, and the entire force advanced. The Moros in the forts of the Sultan and the Datu Tanquan made a fierce resistance, and two colonels fell wounded; but the last works were carried by an assault of the Spanish artillery battalion, Jolo remaining in undisputed possession of the Spaniards.

On the following day a half brigade, with 4 naval guns, took the fort of Panglima Arab, situated in a wood about 1 kilometer from the shore.

The town of Liang was also burned, and a small expedition destroyed 80 boats and burned 90 houses on Tapul Island, besides killing some Moros; and an expedition under General Sanchez destroyed the town of Lacul-Palac, 3 kilometers in the interior from Jolo. The cota at Parang was taken, and later Maibun was taken by a landing party from the fleet under Lieutenant Ordonez. A fort called Alphonso XII was erected on the site of the cota of the Datu Daniel, and a redoubt named "Princesa de Asturias" upon that of the cota of Panglima Arab. Between the two a camp was formed called "Our Lady of Victories." The fort of Alphonso XII was soon completed and 2 infantry regiments, one company Spanish artillery, another of engineers, the 2 disciplinary companies of Balabac and Puerta Princesa, and the "prisoners' brigade" were designated as the garrison of Jolo. Capt. Pascual Cervera was made politico-military governor of the island.

General Malcampo was given the title of "Count of Jolo" and "Viscount of Mindanao", many decorations were given, and a medal was struck for each participant in the campaign.

The Moros made frequent attacks in a small way and resented the occupation of the capital. These attacks were repeated in greater force in April and May but were repulsed in both cases. Fevers decimated the garrison, and even in September the sick numbered 340.

In 1876, there began a series of diplomatic negotiations between Spain, on the one side, and Great Britain and the German Empire, on the other, respecting Spanish sovereignty in Jolo and on the north coast of Borneo, which was not concluded until the protocol of Madrid on March 7, 1885, by which the sovereignty of Spain relinquished any claim to the territories occupied by the British North Borneo Company. It is, however, of interest to note that the British North Borneo Company was the outgrowth of an American company founded in August 1865, under the name of "The American Trading Company of Borneo," under a concession from the Sultan of Brunei.

Among the most important documents of this period may be cited the Madrid protocol of March 11, 1877, between Great Britain, Germany, and Spain, giving free trade and equal rights with Spaniards at Jolo to British and German subjects: the treaty of the Sultan of Jolo and his datus submitting to Spain, signed at Licup (Jolo) July 22, 1878; the letter of incorporation of the British North Borneo Company, dated London, November 7, 1881; and the Anglo-German Spanish protocol of 1885.

In September 1877, a determined assault was made on the Jolo garrison by about 2,000 Moros. After three days of fighting, in which they destroyed some property, they were driven off.

The treaty above mentioned, establishing Spanish sovereignty in the Sulu Archipelago, was signed by the Sultan and Colonel Martinez, the governor, at Licup, Jolo, in 1878.

In this same year, the Datu Uata Mama and his followers assassinated several Spaniards at Tamontaca, Mindanao, among them the judge of the first instance, an army surgeon, a lieutenant, and several soldiers. The act was treacherously carried out while the Spaniards were holding a conference with the Moros. This crime was never punished, the datu dying of cholera in 1882.

In 1878, was also recorded the first case of juramentado. The fanatic attacked and wounded 6 men in the marine barracks at Jolo before he was dispatched. This was the first of a long list of similar attacks at this station, which are detailed briefly below to show the extent to which these outrages grew:

In 1878, 1 man in the public square of Jolo killed 7 and wounded 6 natives, and then escaped.

Six men made an attack injuring 1 Chinaman and 2 Moros; 4 were killed, 2 escaped.

February 9, 1 Moro wounded 5 men, and was killed.

March 3, 1 Moro wounded 3 men, and was killed.

September 16, 1 Moro wounded 2 sentinels, and was killed.

September 29, 4 Moros wounded 2 missionaries, and 2 were killed.

November 25, 13 Moros entered Jolo with arms concealed in bamboo water tubes: 11 were killed by the troops, but not until 13 persons had been wounded.

In 1880, March 30, 40 Moros from Looc attacked a Spanish party, killing 2 soldiers and wounding 8. Twelve of the Moros were killed. This attack was punished by the Sultan, who was awarded the "Cross of Isabel" by the Spanish Government for the service.

In 1881, February 16, 2 Moros were killed in the Jolo trenches after killing a native soldier.

February 19, 4 Moros attacked the Jolo lines, wounding a Spanish ensign, and all were killed.

March 26–28, similar attacks were driven off without loss to the troops. August 29, 3 Moros died at an outpost, killing 1 soldier and wounding 4. September 19, 8 Moros killed 1 soldier and wounded several near Jolo, themselves escaping.

In 1882, September 12, 3 juramentados in the Jolo market wounded 11 soldiers and a native, being killed by the troops.

September 14, 3 Moros wounded a soldier and a native before being dispatched.

September 20, a small band lost 7 killed in an attack upon an outpost.

To suppress these outrages the settlements in which most of them originated, Looc and Boal, were destroyed in October and November 1882, by expeditions from Jolo, and severe losses were inflicted on the Moros by the troops.

Nevertheless, in July 1883, three juramentados in the square of Jolo killed 2 officers and a soldier and wounded an officer and 2 soldiers; 2 of them succeeded in escaping. Later 12 Moros attacked 8 soldiers who were cutting wood near Jolo, and all but two escaped.

In addition to these assassinations a well-organized attack on the garrison at Jolo was made in April 1881, but it was successfully repulsed. On the death of the Sultan a few days later the attack was repeated with the same result.

The juramentado fanaticism was not confined to Jolo. The following cases are recorded among the Rio Grande Moros:

November 1881, one Moro wounded 1 of the mothers of the Moro Orphan Asylum at Tamontaca; he was later beheaded by the Moro Raja Muda.

June 8, 1882, during a religious parade at Cotabato a juramentado beheaded a soldier and wounded another and 2 women before being dispatched by the troops. Soon after another killed 2 soldiers near the Taviran fort.

In 1882, Spanish detachments occupied the stations of Bongao, Siasi, and Tataan.

In 1884, a tour of the Southern Islands was made by the governor-general, de Jovellar, and he reported as follows to the colonial minister:

"The enterprise of occupation is completely paralyzed, and either on account of insufficient means or a badly followed system twenty years have been lost. There is nothing, in effect, further from signifying a proposition of permanence and improvements than the state of all our establishments. There hardly exist the ruins of the buildings formerly erected. At Polloc the old fort and barracks have both completely disappeared. The fort at Cotabato has also completely disappeared, not one stone remaining upon another, and the smaller forts of Libungan, Tumbao, Taviran, and Tamontaca, upon one side or the other of the two arms of the river, could not be more temporary. The troops are badly quartered at all places—in buildings either honeycombed by the white ants or threatening to fall in ruins. In Cotabato the ammunition has become useless on account of the lack of a magazine, and the ordnance supplies and commissaries of the military administration for the garrison are stored in a rented house. Nothing exists in that part of Mindanao to indicate a fixed occupation or thought of permanency except the continued renewal of the troops; each day under worse conditions."

On January 26, General Jovellar returned to Manila, and as a consequence of his representations 100,000 pesos were authorized in the budget of 1885–86 for the construction of a fort for one company, a storehouse, a hospital, and a magazine at Cotabato.

On February 22, 1884, Badurudin, the Sultan of Jolo, died at Maibun without issue. The council at once divided on the succession, the factions favoring Raja Muda Amilol, a youth of 14, and Datu Aliubdin, respectively legitimate son and brother of Diamarol, the preceding sultan. Each faction proclaimed its candidate sultan, at the same time notifying General Parrado, governor of Jolo. The latter preserved a neutral attitude, informing the captain-general of the condition. The proposition from the captain-general that Amilol should be sultan, but under the regency of Aliubdin until his majority, was refused by both factions, and two sultans reigned in Jolo, the boy Amilol, under his mother at Maibun, and his uncle, Aliubdin, at Paticolo. In April of the same year a similar condition of affairs followed the death of the Sultan of Mindanao. Datu Utto having proclaimed his protege, Mamuku, the new sultan, the other datus protested, favoring Mamucpun, of Sibuguey, brother of the late sultan's widow. Following the protest, the Spanish influence favored Mamucpun. In June of this year a royal order conferred on the sultans of Jolo and of Mindanao the honors of a lieutenant general, without command, and the title of "Very Excellent," and salutes were decreed them upon visiting warships.

=== Campaigns of 1886 and 1887 against Rio Grande Moros ===
In Mindanao, Datu Uto had gradually become the most powerful chief upon the Rio Grande. The datus of the lower Rio Grande were harassed continually, and Uto even appeared defiantly before Cotabato with 80 war canoes, an insult to which the garrison was obliged to submit in silence in compliance with a decree forbidding aggressions upon Moros except in self-defense. Later some slaves of Uto escaped to Cotabato, and as they were not returned to him by the Spanish authorities he sent one of his followers into the town to kill one of the fugitives, the order being carried out. The district judge endeavored to secure Uto for trial, but the governor was unable to bring the datu before the court, and upon referring the matter to Manila the captain-general desired the judge to quash the case. When the judge refused he declared martial law and had the judge ordered to Manila, and later abolished the judicial district of Cotabato. Uto became more inimical to and defiant of the Spanish power, and a small expedition was sent against him composed of disciplinarios and troops, the former by land and the latter by gunboats, but the result was unfavorable to the Spanish. Then the Moros burned the Jesuit mission house at Tamontaca, the town of Amadeo, the infantry barracks, the coal sheds of the navy, and other buildings of the garrison of Cotabato, also other buildings on the Rio Grande. Notwithstanding these troubles, General Julian Serina, governor of Mindanao, had an interview with Uto and made an effort to arrange matters peaceably with him, but without satisfactory result, although some escaped slaves were returned to him and he was also paid for alleged losses sustained. Serina then decided to use force, and cited Uto for an interview at Bacat, but receiving no answer troops were ordered to Bacat and the place occupied.

The strategic position of Bacat, situated at the junction of the Bacat and Rio Grande rivers, was such that its permanent occupation would control the entire delta. A force was then formed to occupy the forest of Buhayen; small garrisons were left at Polloc and Tamontaca and 300 men at Cotabato. Two columns of about 300 men each were formed for the advance, moving up the river by steam vessels, no resistance being encountered except at ineffective long range. A landing was made near the wood of Kinodal, where several juramentado attacks were made on the troops. A sharp fire being opened from the woods, the Spanish replied, and in the resulting engagement lost one killed and seven wounded, the Moros losing fifty killed and wounded. The expedition returned to Bacat, where the Moros attacked from the right bank of the river. A force crossed and dispersed them, leaving a detachment to protect the crossing. Moro houses in the vicinity of Bacat were destroyed, and, leaving a garrison of 500 to hold Bacat, the remaining troops were withdrawn to Cotabato.

On March 30 a small column left Cotabato and defeated the Moros at Tamontaca with a loss of 15 killed, and a few days later sank four Moro armed vessels in the backwater of Sapacan, 10 others escaping, but leaving 20 dead, among them the Datu Ladialam.

The approach of the rainy season made it impossible to carry out further operations, and General Serina reported what had been accomplished to the captaingeneral. The latter, upon receiving the report, resolved upon an immediate campaign in person, and so advised Serina, at the same time hiring several vessels, whose arrival at Zamboanga in the rainy season with troops, supplies, commissaries, and forage filled the garrison with astonishment. General Serina, seeing that the greater part of the supplies would be lost by the wet weather, and that a campaign during the rainy season would only result in heavy losses for the Spanish forces, left Zamboanga late in September 1886, for Manila, where he persuaded General Terrero to wait until the end of January or the beginning of February before making an advance.

Upon his return to Zamboanga, Serina transferred his headquarters to Cotabato, where he arrived November 14. On the 15th he sailed in the Bacolod for a trip up the Rio Grande, preceded by a gunboat, 130 soldiers, and some 20 officers as guard. The steamers, joined by 2 gunboats, continued the voyage to Bacat. They were fired upon several times during the trip up and once while returning. On the 20th it was learned that the Datu Sanhuan, an ally of the Spaniards, had been assassinated by partisans of Uto, and that the latter was preparing forts and defenses against the threatened campaign. On December 6, 300 men reinforced Bacat. On the same day the followers of Datu Ayunan revenged themselves at Talayan for the killing of his brother Sanhuan, killing 7 of Uto's followers, 2 of whom were datus. On December 10, 500 men reinforced Cotabato.

On January 1, 1887, Tumbao was occupied by Lieutenant-Colonel Matos with about 300 men from Cotabato and a company of engineers from Libungan. A few days later Lieutenant-Colonel Holguin followed with troops from Zamboanga and Cotabato, and two forts were constructed at a bend in the Rio Grande, 10 miles from Tumbao and 3 from Bacat.

Meanwhile, General Terrero had prepared his expedition, and early in January sailed from Manila with a force composed of 5 infantry regiments, 3 companies of artillery, 2 squadrons of cavalry, 300 disciplinarios, and 8 field and 2 siege guns. After a short stop at Zamboanga the expedition sailed for Polloc, where several gunboats had assembled. On the 14th three transports were sent with troops to Forts Bacat, Liong, and Piramide without a single Moro being seen. On the 19th the cavalry, marines, and some artillery were also taken to Bacat. To compose the expedition ships and troops had been drawn from throughout the archipelago, less than 1,000 men remaining to guard Manila, and not a gunboat or a soldier, except of the civil guard, being left in the Visayas. In Jolo, where hostilities were commencing, Colonel Arolas had but 320 men. Considerable discontent was apparent in Manila from this situation.

The field forces were organized into two columns, the first under General Serina and the second under Colonel San Felin. Serina's force numbered 1,182 men, with 6 field pieces and 4 siege guns; the column of San Felin was 1,129 strong, with 4 field pieces; 1,100 men were retained to garrison the ten forts or stations of Cotabato, Polloc, Libungan, Tumbao, Taviran. Tamontaca, Liong, Piramide, Bacat, and Kudaranga, a total of 3,411 men in the Rio Grande region. On the 26th two columns advanced along the "estero" of Bacat, one numbering 320 men and the other 330. The launch of the Aragon, towing two boats filled with soldiers, steamed along the stream, and many obstacles were removed from the channel. Like work was also done on the 27th and the 28th. On the afternoon of the 28th General Terrero directed a force of 460 men, with 3 guns, to bombard the forts of Saliling from the estero of Buhayen. The Moros replied with cannon, "lantacas," and rifles, but without effect. On the 29th two columns opened a road for 7 Whitworth guns, which opened fire on the forts on the 30th, the bombardment continuing on the 31st. On February 2 a general advance was made by three columns under General Terrero and Colonels San Felin and Matos, that under the captain-general being composed almost entirely of Spaniards, the others being composed largely of native troops. These forces arrived within sight of the forts of Saliling almost without resistance from the enemy, but about 4 p. m. a torrential rain turned the camp into a swamp.

As the torrents of rain continued, the troops were obliged to take refuge at the camp of Reina Regente, the supplies being considerably damaged. A sand battery was built, guarded by 2 guns, and remained garrisoned by 1 company and 20 disciplinarios. Although up to this time the losses had been but 1 artilleryman killed and 2 wounded by the explosion of a gun charge, the hospitals were filled with sick owing to the exposure. On the 9th, the storm having ceased, the captain-general advanced and made his headquarters at the wood of Kinodal, the front being covered by the column of Matos and the left by that of San Felin. Eleven cotas (forts) at Lintunkan impeded the march and on the 11th were bombarded by 5 Krupp and 4 Plasencia guns, a general advance being made by daylight on the 12th.

The vanguard was formed of 2 companies and 120 disciplinarios, under Major Villabrille; the left by General Serina, a column of 3 regiments and the sailors from the Aragon; the right by Colonel San Felin's column of portions of 2 regiments and sailors f 'om the gunboats, General Terrero's headquarters being escorted by a section of engineers and a squadron of cavalry. The condition of the ground greatly retarded the column by delaying the cavalry.

Upon arriving at the backwater or estero of Lintunkan 16 forts or cotas were discovered, but as the greater number were without defenders they were occupied after a very slight resistance from a few forts. The Spanish loss was 1 killed, 1 drowned, and several native soldiers wounded in the feet by bamboo stakes.

On the 13th the sacred grove was occupied, the troops wading to the waist in water the greater part of the time and driving the Moros before them at the grove. The Spanish loss was 6 killed and 17 wounded. The forces returned to Camp Reina Regente. A white flag was hoisted on the first fort of the Datu Kabalo, and after more than two weeks of negotiations the Datu Silungan, paternal uncle of Uto, presented himself to Terrero in the name of Uto, and on March 10 returned with the conditions of peace signed by Uto, his wife Radja Putri, the Sultan of Bacat, and others.

General Terrero then returned to Manila, arriving on March 21, where he was received with great honors and congratulated by the Madrid Government. The expedition is said to have cost over 1,000,000 pesos, part of the funds being taken from the fund of 3,000,000 pesos set aside for the harbor works of Manila, which were greatly crippled thereby. The number of sick was very great, some 680 having been sent to Zamboanga or Manila.

=== Campaigns of 1886–1887 at Jolo ===
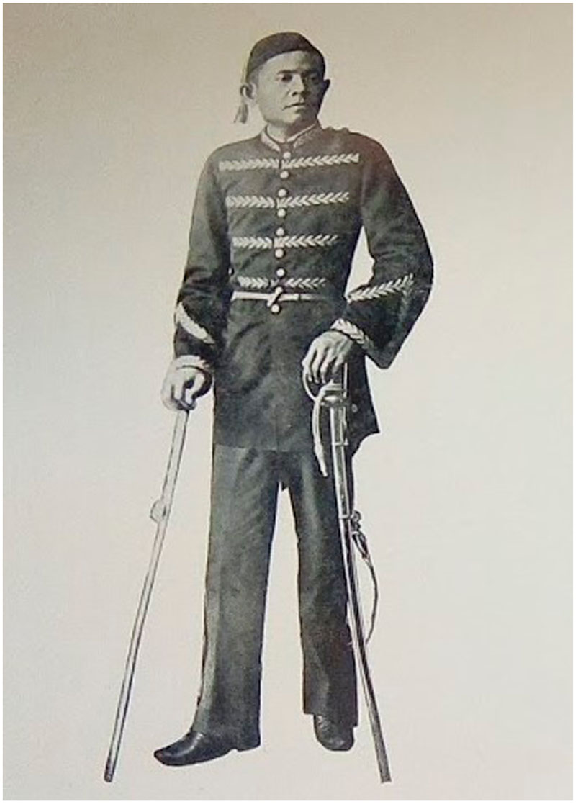
Sultan Harun Ar-Rashid in 1886, Sultan of Sulu from 1886–1894

The situation in regard to the Jolo sultanate, previously described, was further complicated in January 1885, by the application at Manila of the Datu Harun, of Paragua, uncle of Amilol and cousin of Alinbdin, and the only living Moro signatory of the 1878 treaty, for support in his candidacy for the sultanate. He was informed by the governor-general that his full and spontaneous election by the council of Jolo datus would be recognized, whereupon he returned to Paragua, promising that it should be so. The early part of 1886 passed quietly at Jolo, Colonel Arolas having become governor of that station. In September, General Terrero resolved to intervene actively in the disputed sultanate question, and announced Datu Harun as the Sultan or Jolo at a reception at the Malacanan palace in Manila. The reasons given for this action being that Amilol, aided by his mother, was gaining the ascendancy and that his accession had been rendered possible by his mother's crime of poisoning both her husband and the late Sultan Badarudin. In October, Harun sailed for Jolo where he was received by Colonel Arolas. Not being supported by the Jolo datus, it was necessary, under General Terrero's order, for the Spanish troops to give him active support. Accordingly, an expedition of 200 men, with a gunboat, escorted Harun to Parang, where he was received as sultan, but he soon retired to Jolo. Later it was learned that the Moros of the rancheria of Maibun were attacking those of Parang, and Arolas, in company with Harun, made another expedition to Parang on November 2, where several more datus swore allegiance to him; but on December 18 it became necessary to send a gunboat, with 150 men, against the rancheria of Bauisang, which was taken by the troops, the Moro leader, Ambut, being killed in the fight. Tajil, a partisan of Harun, was relieved and the fort of Bauisang destroyed.

Early in January 1887, an expedition was sent with a launch and 40 soldiers against Maibun, where two Moros were killed, and against the settlements of Tamparan and Tuyat, which were destroyed. In this same month an expedition destroyed the settlement of Tumahan and Taudic Bunha. Both of these expeditions were accompanied by the new sultan.

At Siasi, the governor, Rossi, attacked and destroyed Datu Gran's fort, about 3 miles from Siasi, on January 22; 14 Moros were killed in this fight.

By February 1, the Jolo situation was critical. More than half the garrison had been withdrawn for the Rio Grande expedition, leaving less than 300 men to garrison the town and Fort Alphonso XII.

The most important datus had joined Amilol Quiram, and about 3,000 hostile Moros infested the neighborhood of Jolo. During the first week in February five nights were spent by the Spaniards in momentary expectation of an attack, and the situation became most critical. The Moros of Tawi-Tawi, Tatang, Bongao, and Tapul were also in arms, as well as those of Siasi. In the latter island the fort was attacked on the 10th and 12th, but the assailants were driven off with losses on both sides. At Torre Resina, on the Island of Lapac, opposite Siasi, a small garrison of 9 men was attacked by a large force of Moros on the 13th, one being killed and another wounded in the first attack, and later sustaining a siege of three days from 300 Moros, until relieved by a force of 56 men from Siasi, under Capt. Fernandez. In the siege the Moros lost 30 killed, the garrison 1 wounded.

The Mindanao campaign was terminated in March, and the Jolo garrison returned, and on March 12 the strength was about 400. A further reinforcement arrived from Zamboanga in April. It was ordered that the troops should embark at midnight for an expedition. The artillery started with the expedition, but a deep ravine made its return to Jolo necessary. At daybreak the Moros commenced to fire upon the troops, and in turn the Spaniards burned the houses along the trail, both in order to signal their advance to the fleet and to repress the activity of the Moros. At noon the expedition arrived in sight of Maibun, beyond which lay the Spanish fleet at anchor. The principal fort formed a quadrangle about 80 meters square. The north face, which was the one to be assailed, being of coral rock and 2.V meters in height. The south face fronted the sea and had been strengthened with a double parapet of tree trunks over 4 meters in height and five embrasures for cannon, each well protected. The east and west sides were protected fully by timber, swamp, and river and although weaker in construction, an attack there was impracticable. In the interior of the fort was the sultan's palace, a ten-sided building upon high, wooden pillars, and two smaller buildings.

The Spanish advance formed in line at the river, some 300 meters from the fort; 2 companies of the Second Regiment, the rifle section, and second company of disciplinarios formed the head of the column, under Lieutenant-Colonel Novella, and forded the river. The firing then became general. The Moro fort had an American machine gun, which inflicted some losses upon the assailants, but after a fierce resistance to the Spanish charge, led by Colonel Arolas and Lieutenant-Colonel Novella, the fort was captured. The Moro loss was about 130 killed (of which about one-third were killed during the march): the Spanish lost 14 killed and 77 wounded. The Spanish casualties included Lieutenant-Colonel Novella, wounded, while in the list of Moro killed were Naquid Pula, governor of Maibun, the Panglima Timbul, and four datus.

At the close of the fight the fleet landed the Sultan Harun with 50 men, the town and the Chinese quarter were burned, and the fort destroyed. On the 17th the expedition returned to Jolo.

On May 9, Arolas embarked 800 men on the fleet, disembarked at Parang, and marched upon the fort of Panglima Alimanaran, about 4 kilometers in the interior. Upon the approach of the troops the chief hoisted the Spanish flag and submitted to the Sultan Harun, who had accompanied the expedition.

The Panglima Sayari, chief leader of Tapul Island, still remained hostile to Harun, and on May 23 Arolas and the Sultan, with about 800 men, sailed for Tapul. At 7 in the morning the expeditionary forces disembarked, together with 100 men from the fleet; the gunboats then opened fire on the fort and also shelled the surrounding hills. A captain was sent with two companies of the disciplinarios to occupy the settlement of the friendly Datu Buloan, but either by the ignorance or the treachery of the Moro guide he encountered a force of some 300 Moros in a well-defended position, who were commanded by the Panglima Sayari in person. Arolas hurried to the scene, and realizing the danger of defeat sent back for two more companies and four Plasencia guns. A heavy fire was opened upon the Moros, and their leader Sayari, with great coolness, appeared from time to time upon the parapet encouraging his men to resist to the utmost. The fight lasted for four hours and a half and was only terminated by a desperate attack from the entire Spanish force led by Arolas in person, the Moro defense being taken in hand-to-hand fighting, the Panglima Sayari falling dead in the midst of the struggle, together with several of his chiefs. The total Moro dead numbered over 90, the Spanish loss being 13 killed and 115 wounded. The expedition returned to Jolo the following day.

As a result of these fights, many datus submitted to Harun, among them being Anislusin of Siasi and Janjari of Lati. Amilol Quiram and his mother had taken refuge at Talipao, while Aliubdin requested a conference. But the Panglima Sakilan, who governed the northwestern part of the island of Pata, situated south of Jolo, remained in a state of open hostility, and after an examination of the coasts of Pata in June, Arolas decided to lead an expedition to that island. For this purpose, considerable reinforcements, especially the artillery and engineers, were sent to Jolo early in September, where the expedition was formed. It numbered some 1,500 men; the forces also had a battery of four Plasencia guns. The troops embarked on the gunboats on September 19, arriving off the cota of Sakilan on the morning of the 20th. The forces were disembarked and advanced against the fort, which was bombarded by the fleet and finally taken by assault between 2 and 3 o'clock in the afternoon. On the following day another encounter took place, resulting in the flight of the Moros. The Spanish losses were 21 wounded. Colonel Arolas was made a brigadier-general, but continued in command at Jolo.

On December 2, the Sultan Harun was obliged to return to Jolo from the island of Boal on account of the opposition of the inhabitants, and General Arolas found himself obliged to head a force of 700 of the Second Regiment and disciplinarios, which embarked at once with 5 gunboats. Arriving off Boal the troops disembarked and carried the Moro forts after a short action in which 5 men were wounded. The Moro loss was 45 killed, 32 of whom were at the fort and 13 juramentados who had attacked the first landing party. On the 4th the troops returned to Jolo.

The beginning of 1888 witnessed several expeditions and combats, the first being against the Moros of Sariol. On February 19, two half brigades marched out of Jolo, the first under Lieutenant-Colonel Novella, the second under Capt. Victor Diaz, of the artillery. The headquarters and Sultan Harun also accompanied the forces. No opposition was encountered until the district of the Datu Yulcone was entered, but at that time a general fire was opened against the entire column. After some sharp fighting the Moros were driven off and the troops advanced. After a short interval the attack was renewed, an hour being consumed in gaining the plateau of Tambayang. After a short rest General Arolas decided to fall back to Jolo, and the column retired, harassed by the Moros until the territory of the friendly Datu Yau-Yali was reached. Jolo was reentered at '5 in the afternoon, the troops having suffered a loss of 2 killed and 18 wounded, 13 of the latter being disciplinarios. The Moro loss as reported was 7 killed and 16 wounded.

Another expedition to Paticolo on February 24 resulted in the death of some 11 Moros and the wounding of 60. The Spanish forces lost 1 officer and 19 men wounded, 15 from the disciplinarios.

On the 27th, four companies of artillery, a mountain section with two guns, a company of engineers, and 250 of the Fourth Regiment arrived at Jolo. On March 3 at daylight, an expedition nearly 2,000 strong left Jolo, under the command of General Arolas, for a march through the little-known district of Lati. On the afternoon of the same day the settlement of the Panglima Arosa was taken and destroyed, the Spanish having 7 wounded, the losses of the enemy being considerably greater.

On the 11th, another expedition, numbering 1,500 men, left Jolo on 7 war vessels in the harbor and disembarked at the point of Pandanan, in the eastern part of the island. A vigorous campaign was then begun, the Moros being defeated at Paticolo, Porrion, Piquidapo and Piqnidajo on the 15th, 16th, 19th, 22d, 26th and 27th of March, the dead Moros amounting to the number of 56. The Spanish losses were 7 killed and 84 wounded in the several fights.

Notwithstanding the apparent supremacy of Sultan Harun, the Moros of Jolo persisted in their allegiance to Amilol Quiram, and the Spanish Government gave up the attempt to force Harun upon the people. Amilol Quiram was then recognized as the Sultan of Jolo.

=== Campaigns against Mindanao Moros (1888–1898) ===
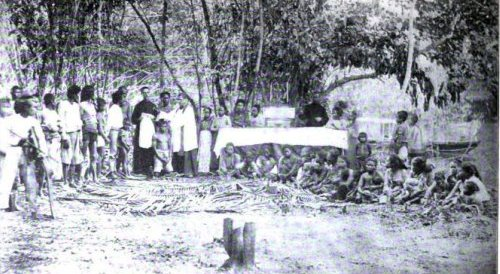
Two Spanish missionaries baptizing a Moro convert to Roman Catholicism, circa 1890.

On January 5, 1888, Lieutenant-General Valeriano Weyler became captain-general in succession to General Terrero. Upon his arrival the military forces of the Philippines numbered 12,800 men, of whom 1,400 were Spaniards (of the artillery regiment) and the balance natives. The years 1888 and 1889 were without important military operations, and in the latter year the infantry regiments were renumbered. The new names and numbers, dating from October 31, 1889, were as follows: Sixty-eighth, Sixty-ninth, Seventieth, Seventy-first, Seventy-second, Seventy-third, and Seventy-fourth. The disciplinary battalion was also retained.

The fortified isthmus from Lintogup to Tucuran, begun by Terrero, was finished in 1890, with the fort of Infanta Isabel being midway at Lubig. Posts were established at Parang-Parang, Tinancu, and Macar, the latter on the Bay of Sarangani.

Relations with the Mindanao Moros, especially those of Lake Lanao, a region which had not been visited by Spanish forces since the days of Corcuera, two and a half centuries before, began to be strained through the establishment of those posts, and Weyler decided that operations were necessary against further aggressions.

However, the outbreak in the Caroline Islands in June 1890, made an expedition to that distant part of the colony necessary and delayed operations in Mindanao until April 1891. On October 15, 1890, a band of Moros surprised the settlement of Monticao, near Iligan. killing 20 natives and carrying off 24. Other attacks of a minor nature also took place. On April 16, 1891, General Weyler sailed for Mindanao, and on the 20th arrived at Parang-Parang, where 4 companies of the Spanish artillery regiment, 3 companies of the Sixty-eighth, 3 companies of the Seventysecond regiment, a section of cavalry, and 2 mountain guns were assembled.

Two expeditionary columns were organized under Lieutenant-Colonels Marina and Hernandez and took the field on April 23 and 24, respectively. That of Marina composed of the Spanish company and the three companies of the Sixty-eighth, marched from Parang upon the rancheria of Lipauan on the 23rd, arriving at the place on the morning of the 24th, and discovered a fort garrisoned by 30 or 40 Moros. The place was attacked and captured, 1 Spaniard being severely wounded, and at 11 that night the Spanish forces made a return march towards Parang, the latter place being reached in a sixteen-hour march of great difficulty.

The column under Lieutenant-Colonel Hernandez, composed of one Spanish company and three companies of the Seventy-second Regiment, left Parang on the 24th against the rancheria of Buldung. The first day six rivers had to be crossed, the column bivouacking, the march being resumed the next morning. The camp that night was beside the Rio Sumased, the advance being resumed at dawn on the 26th. At half past 8 the column arrived before the cota of Buldung, which was defended by about 200 Moros. The column immediately attacked and took the fort with a loss of 2 killed, 3 severely wounded, and 5 slightly wounded, one of the latter being Lieutenant-Colonel Hernandez. Six dead Moros were seen, and many were wounded. The following day the column returned to its base.

On the 28th, a force consisting of 6 companies left Parang for Baras, where a fort was constructed with a capacity of 200 men. Expeditions were also sent out through the country between Parang and Tucuran and to the lake called Lanao Chico by the Spaniards (now Dapao). The Lanao Moros. however, attacked the forces at Baras several times, in one of which attacks the Sultan of Bayan was wounded.

On April 30, a column composed of 8 companies, commanded by Colonel Hore, of the artillery, left Baras for Maladi. where a body of Malanao Moros were reported to be fortified, and after a few hours' march the vanguard, under Lieutenant-Colonel Hernandez, discovered the Moros in a fort strongly protected. Upon seeing the Spanish force, many Moros attacked the column, but Hernandez advanced and took the fort after a hard fight. No less than 85 dead Moros. including the Sultan Benidel and 11 datus, were found within the fort, and 21 prisoners were taken. The Spanish loss was but 2 killed and 3 severely wounded. This fight is deemed to have been one of the most brilliant between the Spanish and Moros.

But just at this time all operations were stopped by an epidemic of "la grippe," which so affected the troops that on June 24 but 250 men were fit for duty, not one of whom was a Spaniard. At Parang 450 were sick; at Cotabato, 150; at Zamboanga, 600; and 190 at Isabela de Basilan.

General Weyler occupied Malabang in July 1891, with eight companies and commenced the erection of Fort Corcuera, which occupied nearly the site of Corcuera's Sabanilla. A column under Captain Pintos was also sent toward Ganassi and took two cotas. The Moros attacked Malabang but were repulsed, and Weyler left for the Rio Grande, where the construction of three forts was ordered. Communication was also opened with Cagayan de Misamis. the mail being sent by the Pulangi (Rio Grande) River to Catitnan and then via land through Linabo to Cagayan. The politico-military government of Cotabato was also divided, that part of the river Nituan to Punta de Firchas being erected in the "Comandancia de la Bahia Illana".

General Weyler then decided to attack the Lanao Moros from the north. To divert the attention of those living on the southern part of the lake, he ordered the commanding officer on Illana Bay to make a demonstration toward Ganassi about August 17, penetrating as far as possible into the enemy's territory. The troops for the main attack were organized into a "flying column" of 360 men, under Captain Pintos; the "first column" of 300 men, under Colonel Castilla, of the artillery; the "second column" of 522 men, under Lieutenant-Colonel Cortijo. The "first" and "flying" columns were landed at Linamon August 15, 1891, and marched up the left bank of the Agns River toward the lake, while the "second" column marched out of Iligan on the 16th, following the right bank of the Agus to the lake. Another force was landed at Galan to prevent the Moros of the rancheria of Manay from aiding those of Marantao, while a body of 160 men occupied Balud. The various columns returned on the 23d to their respective starting places, having severely punished the above-mentioned rancherias, killed their dates and the leader Amay Pac-Pac. together with many other Moros. and displayed the Spanish flag where it had not been seen for two hundred and fifty-one years. A fort was also erected near Momungan en route to Lake Lanao from Iligan, and another post was established on the river Liangan, near the point of Binuni, which was named Almonte, after the Spanish general of that name who fought the Moros more than a hundred years before. The Illana Bay column, which left on August 17, under Lieut. Col. Antonio Moras, for Ganassi, defeated the Moros at Catalaluan, near the lake, killing 7.and then returning to Malabang with a loss of 1 wounded. As a consequence of this march many chiefs and datus. including the Sultan of Ganassi, presented themselves at Malabang and recognized the suzerainty of Spain.

General Weyler was relieved as captain-general of the Philippines on November 17, 1891, being succeeded by Despujol, who. on a visit to Momungan, narrowly escaped assassination at the hands of a Moro datu (Datu Timbul Ali), who killed several soldiers when he discovered his inability to find the captain-general. On May 4, 1891, Lieutenant-General Ramon Blanco became captain-general. He conducted the last considerable Moro campaign in Mindanao.

Iligan was determined upon as the base of supplies, and Blanco arrived there in March 1894, by which time 3,000 troops had been assembled there. The troops worked upon the road from Iligan to Momungan, and 250 convicts sent from Bilibid prison, Manila, were added to the road force.

On April 11, a band of about 100 Moros made an attack upon the cattle guard at Malabang, consisting of 35 men, but were repulsed with a loss of 7 killed and several wounded. Upon hearing the firing other troops came out, accompanied by Capt. Manuel Prieto, the politico-military governor of the district, who was attacked by some of the wounded Moros whom he had ordered to be cared for, and wounded so badly that his left hand had to be amputated.

General Blanco left Iligan for Momungan April 22. On the 23d the Moros attacked a detachment of woodcutters at Cabasaran, wounding 23, including Lieutenant Salgado of the Seventy-fourth. The Moros, however, were driven off, leaving 9 dead on the ground and many wounded. In May reinforcements of 350 arrived at Iligan.

In May, the Spanish advance lines were at Pantar, where General Parrado and Colonel Novella also had their headquarters, and Cabasaran was occupied. The greatest difficulty was experienced in the transportation of supplies, the carabao becoming useless through fatigue, and the trail being too rough for the supplies to be taken in baskets on poles. On May 8 a company of disciplinarios was attacked at Pagua, about 2 kilometers from Ulama, by some CO Moros, who wounded 2 men, 1 mortally. The Moros were repulsed with a loss of 8 killed and some 25 wounded.

On May 15, General Blanco published a general order by which the field forces were organized into a brigade, under command of Brig. Gen. Julian Gonzales Parrado, the politico-military governor of Mindanao, divided into two demibrigades. as follows: First demibrigade, 11 companies, Col. Federico Novella, commanding; second demibrigade, 10 companies, Col. Enrique Hore, commanding; troops attached to general headquarters, about 750 men.

On May 22, Moros near Momungan attacked a convoy guarded by 250 men and killed 4 and wounded 7 soldiers. They were driven off with a loss of 4 killed, one of whom was the Datu Sampiano, who had tried to kill Despujol on his visit to Iligan and Momungan (now Baloi, Lanao del Norte) about two years before. On June 2, while a convoy was being escorted to Camp Ulama from Momungan, 15 Moros attacked the convoy, killing 4 soldiers and wounding 2, but were driven off with loss of 8 or 10 killed.

On the 3d Colonel Novella, with his demibrigade, made a reconnaissance. After much hard work in the jungle and crossing ravines, the height of Tomarmol was climbed about 10 a. m., the Moros offering slight resistance. In the afternoon Pimba and Panco were taken without difficulty, and the column returned to camp. The Spanish loss was 1 killed and 3 wounded, that of the Moros being estimated at 16 killed and many wounded. On June 5, Colonel Novella captured the cota of Datu Noral Kakin at Mut Pu, with a loss of 2 wounded, the Moros retreating without much resistance. The column returned to camp.

In June, Blanco left Parrado in command of the operations in Mindanao, returning to Manila on the 19th.

On June 9, a band of 500 Moros attacked the troops working on the road near Pantar; 41 Moros were killed and about 50 wounded. June 26 the sick in hospital at Iligan numbered 147, of whom 46 were Spaniards and 101 natives; malarial fever and dysentery prevailing among the former and ulcers and intestinal catarrh prevailing among the latter. On July 9, 400 Moros from various rancherias, commanded by Juarna Mamasa Balabagan, of Maguindanao, attacked a road-working force under Captain Salazar, who was killed, as were also several of his men. After a hard fight the Moros were repulsed with a loss of 26 killed, 14 mortally and 46 others were wounded, among the latter being 5 datus and a pandita (priest).

On July 24, the advance arrived near the lake of Calanganan(Pantar Lanao del Norte), where more than 1,000 Moros under the Datu Amani Pac Pac and the sultans of Maciu, Ramain, and Tugaya had assembled. Here the Spaniards were attacked by more than 500 Moros, ambushed on each side of the road, and driven back in some confusion. A reenforcement of 200 arrived at this moment; an advance was ordered and the Moros were driven back, the Spanish loss being 2 killed and 9 wounded, while that of the Moros was reported as about 250 killed and 300 arms left on the field.

In September, the Sultan Rumani, the reputed ruler of 18 towns on the lake, visited the Spanish commander at Ulama, to indicate his desire for peace with Spain. In October the work of building the suspension bridge across the Agus was begun.

About November 10, General Blanco returned to the scene of operations for a short time only. The Agus River bridge was finished and opened on February 27, 1895. The bridge consisted of a suspension span 40 meters long, with approaches of 21 meters and 12 meters, respectively, and was intended to bear the weight of railway trains.

In February, General Blanco again visited Iligan, and on March 10, at noon, the cota of Amani Pac Pac at Marahui was attacked by Spaniards. After a fight of four hours the fort was taken and the army gained the desired position on Lake Lanao; Generals Blanco, Parrado, and Aguirre were present and a cantonment was at once established.

On May 9, some 40 Moros attacked Las Piedras, killing 2 and wounding 3 soldiers, but themselves losing 9 killed. On July 12, some 40 Moros from the rancherias of Tugaya and Putud, bearing a Spanish flag, approached a working party and attacked the soldiers, escaping with several rifles, after killing 2 soldiers and wounding 38.

On August 18, the launch Lanao was launched at Marahui, the others being nearly finished.

Many Moro dignitaries gave their adherence to Spain about this time, among them being the Rajah Muda of Ganassi, the Datu Pranga-Rungan of Tugayas, and the Datu Uregan of Maciu, said to have been the councilor-general of the Lake of Lanao.

In October 1895, the Spanish forces were again reorganized, a division of two brigades being constituted. The division was commanded by Gen. Gonzales Parrado, the Northern Brigade by General de los Rios, and the Southern Brigade by General Luis Huertas.

Divisional troops: Three companies engineers, mortar battery, cavalry squadron, and troops of the military administration.

First (Northern) Brigade: About 10 companies of infantry. 2 companies disciplinarios, and 1 mountain batten'.

Second (Southern) Brigade: About 10 companies of infantry, 2 companies disciplinarios, 2 companies of engineers, 1 company of foot artillery, 1 mountain battery.

The garrisons were as follows: Two companies of infantry and 1 company of engineers at Iligan; 1 company of infantry at Las Piedras; 2 companies of infantry at Camp Maria Cristina; 2 companies of infantry at Momungan: one-half company of infantry at Fort Tiradores; 3 companies of infantry at Camp Victoria. At Fort Briones, one-half company infantry; Fort Salazar, 1 company engineers, 1 company infantry; Fort Lumbayanegui, one-third company of infantry: Fort Nuevo, one-half company of Infantry; camp at Marahui. 10 companies of infantry, 1 mountain battery, 1 company engineers, mortar battery, naval battery, and cavalry squadron.

For escort purposes each branch of the service was to furnish an eighth of its force, except the cavalry, which was to furnish only a noncommissioned officer and 4 soldiers. Garrisons of forts mentioned above were exempted from furnishing escorts. Troops from Iligan were to convoy trains through to Marahui. Troops of the Seventy-third and Seventy-fourth to return to Sungut and Victoria the following morning and while resting were only to be employed in instruction and rifle practice.

The cargadores (bearers) were not to be employed in any other labor whatever.

From the report of General Blanco, dated Marahui, October 19, 1895, to the Spanish minister of war, the following is gleaned:

Both horses and carabao are unsuitable for work on the road, the former on account of lack of strength and the latter on account of slowness and inability to work without very frequent water or mud baths. In consequence half of the army was compelled to work at keeping the road in repair.

Material for 35 kilometers of the railway was at Iligan, which was enough to complete the same to the suspension bridge of Alphonso XIII over the Agus.

The railway route would have to deviate from the road slightly to the west in the first 10 or 12 kilometers from Iligan in order to ascend the passes of Tominubo and Nonucan, Fort Maria Cristina being 450 meters above the sea at the head of the Nonucan. From Maria Cristina to the bridge the railway could follow the wagon road. From Iligan to Fort de las Piedras was 11 kilometers: from the latter fort to the river Nonucan was 2 kilometers. The bridge over this river is commanded by Fort Maria Cristina, which also covers several trails leading to important Moro rancherias. From the river Nonucan to the fort at Momungan on Agus River, which is of considerable width at this point, was 4 kilometers. From Momungan to Fort Tiradores at Banar 3 kilometers. This fort commanded the approaches to some rancherias, and also the ascent to the cota of Bulut on the same hill, while 4 kilometers distant was the lake of Calaganan, near which were Fort Victoria and Fort Salgado, the latter near the wood of Balete. To this succeeds the plateau of Ulama, dominated by Fort Briones, which is in sight of Fort Salazar, 2 kilometers distant. This latter fort situated 40 meters above the bridge of Alphonso XIII across the Agus, together with the Fort of Sungut, on the opposite bank, commanded the crossing and also guarded Linanan. For 5 kilometers beyond Sungut the country was rolling, open, and cultivated, and protected by the small fort of Lumbayanaqui, which also guarded the nearby wood of Vito. Here the road ascended a precipitous hill to the extensive and elevated plateau in which Lake Lanao is situated at a level of about 800 meters above the sea. At the summit of the hill was Fort Nuevo, 2 kilometers from Marahui, the station on the lake. Marahui was also flanked by the redoubts of Aranda and Allanegui, which defended the landing place.

On February 17, 1896, about a thousand reinforcements arrived at Iligan from Manila. General Blanco and General Aguirre also visited Iligan on March 6. The road was found in bad condition on account of eight days'rain. On March 12 the captain-general arrived at Marahui. The water supply from Lake Lanao was found to be as satisfactory as that from a spring at Fort Nuevo.

Two Moros seized the rifles of 2 native soldiers, and on the night of the 12th Fort Nuevo, garrisoned by 50 men, was attacked by the Moros, who were repulsed with a loss of several killed.

The maximum temperature of Marahui is stated to have been 27 °C., and minimum 12 °C. (April and May).

On February 25, Fort Reina Regente, on the hills of Tinuncup, in the Rio Grande Valley, 18 meters about the sea, was garrisoned. The commanding officer, Col. Ricarto Perez, is said to have been asked by Datu Utto if 10,000 men could take the fort, to which the Spanish officer replied that all the Moros in Mindanao could not take it. At this time the most advanced post of the Spaniards was Fort Picit, 34 miles above Reina Regente, but another at Catituan, 8 leagues beyond Picit, was contemplated.

On March 20, a company of disciplinarios under Capt. Felipe Garde was attacked by a number of Moros while clearing ground near the new fort of Corcnera at Malabang, losing 5 rifles and having 7 men wounded. Later these Moros were surprised at Baqui, near old Fort Corcuera, 18 being killed and 12 wounded. On March 30 a detachment of Spanish troops, together with 180 Moro allies, left Corcuera for the source of the river Mataling in search of a hostile force from the rancherias of Pualas, Bacolod, Gadungan, Boras, and Dinaposas, but without result.

In the latter part of March the gunboat Panay shelled some Moros at the mouth of the river Macklin.

On April 1, General Blanco left Marahni for Iligan, where he embarked for Zamboanga and the Rio Grande region. At this time the military organizations in Mindanao were as follows: The division of Mindanao, with headquarters at Zamboanga; First Brigade, Gen. F. Castilla. comprising second, third, and seventh districts, headquarters Iligan or Marahni; Second Brigade, headquarters ParangParang, Col. C. Lasala, comprising first, fourth, fifth, and sixth districts. Colonel Hereidla, count of Terra Alta, was politico-military governor of Lanao, the actual command, however, being under Colonel del Real. Gen. Luis Huerta was politico-military governor of Jolo and Gen. Diego de losRios was politico-military governor of Eoilo.

On April 12, General Blanco arrived in Illana Bay and inspected the new fort of Malabang on the 13th. During his visit some Moros attacked the place, but were repulsed, leaving 22 dead on the field. On the following day a Spanish force on a scout was attacked, General Aguirre and Lieutenant-Colonel Soro being wounded. General Aguirre returned to Manila on May 10, and General Blanco also returned after visiting the forts of Polloc and Cotabato.

In April 1896, some piratical vessels robbed a boat on the coast of Occidental Negros, but pursuit of them was not effective.

On April 29, the garrison of Marahui consisted of 1,700 men, with 40 sick.

Near Baras, 6 miles west of Malabang, 40 men, under a captain, away from the fort, were attacked by Moros, but after a sharp fight the latter were repulsed with a loss of 5 datus and 11 others killed. The Spaniards had 1 soldier mortally and 3 severely wounded.

On July 1, 1896, the city of Manila presented a sword of honor to General Blanco as a memorial of his campaign in Mindanao.

On July 9, a juramentado killed a soldier at Cotabato and was himself killed by soldiers of the garrison.

On August 7, the Sultan of Tugaya presented himself at Marahui with a request for peace.

On August 9, a Moro attacked and wounded a lieutenant in the Lanao country, but was killed by the latter.

The outbreak of the Tagalog insurrection in August 1896. evidently influenced the disciplinarios, of whom some 300 belonging to the Third and Fourth companies deserted late in September from the Lanao country, making for Misamis Province. They were pursued and defeated near Opol and Agusan in Misamis. A sergeant killed Lieut. Bueno Espanosa at Lintogup on September 16. He was afterwards shot at Iligan.

On November 12, 80 Moros from a rancheria near Taraca attacked a convoy escorted by some marine infantry near Aparicolo, killing 1 soldier and wounding 3. The Moros were driven off with a loss of 3 killed and 23 wounded.

On November 19, the lake gunboats General Blanco, Coreuera, and Almonte, near Bayan, were fired upon by the Moros. After returning the fire the vessels returned to Marahui. where two companies and some marines embarked for Bayan, which was bombarded and a loss of 100 killed inflicted upon the Moros. Later the cota of Bacolod was bombarded and destroyed, and 3 deserters from the disciplinarios were shot at Marahui.

In December, a so-called insurgent governor was captured and shot at Misamis. On December 24 a force of deserters was defeated near Cagayan Misamis, and the leader, a former Corporal Bravo, was killed. On the same day Major San Martin, with 60 soldiers, attacked and defeated another band of deserters who were in possession of the Church at Milagros Viejo (Butuan Valley), killing 4 and wounding many, while 2 soldiers (natives—Tagalogs) were executed at Iligan on the 29th for complicity in the uprising; and during January 2 corporals and 5 soldiers were shot at Tucuran and Cotabato for the same crime.

On April 11, 1897, a plot was discovered at Jolo implicating many of the deported Tagalog insurgents and some of the men of the Sixty-eighth Regiment, the plan being to overthrow the Spanish rule at Jolo. As a result of the plot 13 former insurgents were sentenced to death, together with 3 corporals of the Sixth-eighth Regiment.

General Polavieja was relieved on April 23, 1897, by General Primo de Rivera as captain-general of the Philippines.

On May 15, 8 juramentados from the rancheria of Boal, Jolo, went to Bus-Bus, a suburb of Jolo, and attacked some soldiers of the Sixty-eighth Regiment, who were landing in a small boat. The soldiers fired on them, killing 6 of the number in the water and 2 on shore.

During the spring of 1897 expeditions were made by the lake gunboats from Marahui against the cotas of Bayan, Binadayan, and Bacolod. Later operations were carried on against the rancherias of Sugut, Molundum, and Lipo. On May 15 two companies and the lake launches attacked the settlements of Uato and Malaig, near Marahui. In July 1897, Fort Corcuera, built by the military engineer, Galvez, was garrisoned by one company of infantry, and Fort Baras by one company. There was also one company guarding the isthmus, with posts at Tucuran, Lnbig, and Lintogup; headquarters at Parang. The posts on Illana Bay were visited about every ten days by the gunboats Panay and Mariveles, which had their headquarters at Polloc.

In July, other deserters from the disciplinarios were being pursued by troops from Iligan.

On August 7, 1897, the third squadron of Thirty-first Cavalry left Manila for Iligan to relieve the cavalry serving in that district.

In July 1897, the forts on the Rio Grande de Mindanao were Cotabato, Reina Regente, Picit, Kudarangan, Taviran, Tamontaca, and Labungan. The gunboats Gardoqui and Urdaneta were also in the vicinity.

In October 1897, Moros attacked the Spanish fort near Las Piedras, wounding 2 soldiers. One Moro was killed, and later the rancheria of the assailants was destroyed and 3 Moros killed.

On November 13, nearly all the buildings at Marahui were destroyed by fire, which the prevalence of a strong wind facilitated. Almost at the same time Iligan was inundated by the rivers at that place and much damage done.

On December 15, a small force from Iligan, in pursuit of some escaped deported natives of Luzon, was attacked by Moros. Four Moros and 4 of the deported natives were killed in the fight, the Spaniards also losing 1 man killed.

On February 4, 1898, General Buil directed 4 columns under Lieutenant-Colonels Brandeis, Iturriaga, Torres-Ascarza. and Ruiz Toledo from Marahui, which, together with the 3 gunboats on Lake Lanao, destroyed the rancherias of Bonto, Buayan, Ragayan, Minbalay, and Macro. The Moro losses were 32 killed, 80 wounded, and 25 prisoners; Spanish losses not given.

General Primo de Rivera was succeeded in April by General Basilio Agustin; and the destruction of the fleet, on May 1, cut off the Southern Islands from Manila until the middle of August, at which time General Jaudenes represented the Spanish power at Manila and General delos Rios at Iloilo. In December General de los Rios evacuated Iloilo. the Spanish troops being concentrated at Zamboanga from all parts of Mindanao under the command of General Montero. The last Spanish politico-military governor of Iligan was most likely Captain Ricardo Carnicero Sanchez, who was appointed to that position on November 1, 1898.

The four Spanish gunboats were scuttled in the deeper part of Lake Lanao. The post of Marahui was abandoned, and the Moros assert that the bridge over the Agus River was destroyed by the Spanish troops.

The dates of the occupation of the country by the American forces was as follows:

- Sulu Archipelago - May 1899
- Zamboanga - Dec 7, 1899
- Cotabato - Dec 12, 1899
- Davao - Dec 20, 1899
- Polloc - Dec 21, 1899
- Mati - Dec 22, 1899
- Parang - Jan 5, 1900
- Surigao - Mar 29, 1900
- Cagayan - Mar 31, 1900
- Iligan - Apr 1, 1900
- Misamis and Dapitan - Apr 1, 1900
- Oroquieta - July 11, 1900
- Camp Vicars - May 2, 1902
- Nonucan - Nov 1902
- Pantar - Mar 1903

== Chinese weapons deliveries to the Moros against Spain ==
Attempts at people seeking Ottoman intervention against Spain in the Moro Sultanates ended in failure.

Chinese who lived in Sulu ran guns across a Spanish blockade to supply the Moro Datus and Sultanates with weapons to fight the Spanish, who were engaging in a campaign to subjugate the Moro sultanates on Mindanao. A trade involving the Moros selling slaves and other goods in exchange for guns developed. The Chinese had infiltrated the economy of the sultanate, taking control of the Sultanate's economies in Mindanao and dominating the markets. Though the Sultans did not like the fact that the Chinese had a monopoly over the economy, they did business with them. The Chinese set up a trading network between Singapore, Zamboanga, Jolo and Sulu.

The Chinese sold small arms like Spencer rifles to the Buayan Datu Uto. They were used to battle the Spanish invasion of Buayan. The Datu paid for the weapons in slaves. The population of Chinese in Mindanao in the 1880s was 1,000. The Chinese ran guns across a Spanish blockade to sell to Mindanao Moros. The purchases of these weapons were paid for by the Moros in slaves in addition to other goods. The main group of people selling guns were the Chinese in Sulu. The Chinese took control of the economy and used steamers to ship goods for exporting and importing. Opium, ivory, textiles, and crockery were among the other goods which the Chinese sold.

The Chinese on Maimbung sent the weapons to the Sulu Sultanate, who used them to battle the Spanish and resist their attacks. A Chinese-Mestizo was one of the Sultan's brothers-in-law, the Sultan was married to his sister. He and the Sultan both owned shares in the ship (named the Far East) which helped smuggled the weapons.

The Spanish launched a surprise offensive under Colonel Juan Arolas in April 1887 by attacking the Sultanate's capital at Maimbung in an effort to crush resistance. Weapons were captured and the property of the Chinese were destroyed while the Chinese were deported to Jolo.

Muslim Moros like Datu Piang, and the families with the Kong and Tan surnames are the results of non-Muslim Chinese merchants marrying Moros and their Han Chinese Moro mestizo offspring became Muslim. The Chinese merchant Tuya Tan of Amoy was the father of the Moro leader Datu Piang who was born to a Maguindanaon Moro woman.

Filipino Christian settlers were massacred by Moros under Djimbanan, his brother Datu Ali and Datu Piang in September and December 1899. Only the Chinese were not harmed.

An Urdu speaking Afghan named Sharif Muhammad Afdal lived in Mindanao and helped advise Datu Piang. Sharif Muhammad Afdal helped the US try to convince Moros to cooperate during the Us war against the Moros. Serial set (no.4001-4500)

"The Moros then looted the town, although apparently the Chinese residents, with whom they were always friendly, were not molested - only the Filipinos"

Datu Piang, as a Moro-Chinese mestizo, led Chinese and Moros to defeat and kill Filipino revolutionaries under Ramon Vilo who tried to seize control of Cotabato when the Spanish left in January 1899.

At "the time of the Spanish evacuation [Piang] had become the richest Moro in Mindanao and the most influential chief in the island" according to Najeeb Saleeby. Cotabato based Chinese merchants who had close links to Datu Piang bought 150,000 Mexican dollars' worth of gutta-percha, almaciga, coffee, beeswax and rice in 1901.

== Resistance ==
The Moros maintained their independence from the Spanish, battling them constantly, it took until the final 2 decades of the presence of the Spanish in the Philippines for them to launch an extensive conquest of Mindanao.

== See also ==
- Moro Rebellion
- Moros during World War II
- Moro insurgency in the Philippines
- Castille War (Spanish-Bruneian War)
- Piracy in the Sulu Sea
