= 1693 in literature =

This article contains information about the literary events and publications of 1693.

== Events ==
- February 27 – March 17 – John Dunton publishes The Ladies' Mercury in London, the first periodical specifically for women.
- March – William Congreve's first play, the comedy The Old Bachelor, is performed at the Theatre Royal, Drury Lane in London.
- May – William Bradford prints the first book in New York, George Keith's New-England's Spirit of Persecution Transmitted to Pennsylvania.
- July 29 – Anthony Wood is condemned in the vice-chancellor's court of the University of Oxford for libels against Edward Hyde, 1st Earl of Clarendon. He is fined and banished from the university until he recants. The offending pages are burned.
- October – Congreve's comedy The Double Dealer is first performed at Drury Lane.
- unknown dates
  - Joseph Addison addresses an early poem to John Dryden.
  - Swedish scholar Petter Salan publishes in Upsala Fortissimorum pugilum Egilli et Asmundi historiam antqvo gothico sermone exaratam, the first printed edition of the 14th century Egils saga einhenda ok Ásmundar berserkjabana.
  - Venetian sea-captain Julije Balović compiles Pratichae Schrivaneschae, including a five-language multilingual glossary.
  - London printer William Anderton is hanged for treason at Tyburn for producing two anonymous Jacobite pamphlets.

== New books ==
=== Fiction ===
- The Genuine Remains of Dr. Thomas Barlow (posthumous)
- Li Yu (李漁, probable author) – The Carnal Prayer Mat (written 1657)
- The Third Part of the Pilgrim's Progress (anonymous)
- Catherine Trotter (or Catherine Trotter Cockburn) – Olinda's Adventures; or, The Amours of a Young Lady
- Sir Thomas Urquhart and Peter Anthony Motteux – first complete English translation of Rabelais' Gargantua and Pantagruel
- Vertue Rewarded

=== Drama ===
- John Bancroft – Henry the Second, King of England; With the death of Rosamond
- William Congreve
  - The Old Bachelor
  - The Double Dealer
- Thomas D'Urfey – The Richmond Heiress, or A Woman Once in the Right
- Henry Higden – The Wary Widow, or Sir Noisy Parrot
- George Powell – A Very Good Wife (adapted from Richard Brome's The City Wit and The Court Beggar)
- Elkanah Settle – The New Athenian Comedy (published)
- Thomas Southerne – The Maid's Last Prayer, or Any Rather Than Fail
- Thomas Wright – The Female Virtuosos

=== Poetry ===
- John Dryden – Examen Poeticum: Being the Third Part of Miscellany Poems (anthology)

=== Non-fiction ===
- John Dennis – The Impartial Critick
- John Dryden – A Discourse Concerning the Origin and Progress of Satire
- John Evelyn – The Compleat Gard'ner
- August Hermann Francke – Manuductio ad lectionem Scripturae Sacrae
- Robert Gould – The Corruption of the Times by Money
- John Locke – Some Thoughts Concerning Education
- Cotton Mather – Wonders of the Invisible World
- William Penn – An Essay towards the Present and Future Peace of Europe by the Establishment of a European Dyet, Parliament or Estates
- Thomas Rymer – A Short View of Tragedy
- Gabrielle Suchon – Traité de la morale et de la politique (On Morality and Politics)
- Samuel Wesley – The Life of Our Blessed Lord

== Births ==
- March 5 – Johann Jakob Wettstein, Swiss theologian (died 1754)
- May 10 – John Fox, English biographer (died 1763)
- June 17 – Johann Georg Walch, German theologian (died 1775)
- Unknown dates
  - Fray Casimiro Diaz, O.S.A., Spanish Augustinian friar and historian (died 1746)
  - Arthur Young, English religious writer and cleric (1759)
- probable – Eliza Haywood, English dramatist, journalist and novelist (died 1756)

== Deaths ==
- February 7 – Paul Pellisson, French lawyer and author (born 1624)
- April 9 – Roger de Rabutin, Comte de Bussy, French memoirist (born 1618)
- May 25 – Madame de La Fayette, French writer (born 1634)
- May 27 – John Spencer, English scholar and cleric (born 1630)
- August (end) – Charles Blount, English deist author (suicide, born 1654)
- September 9 – Ihara Saikaku (井原西鶴), Japanese poet and author of "floating-world" fiction (born 1642)
