= Pilgrim's Progress (disambiguation) =

The Pilgrim's Progress is a 1678 novel by John Bunyan.

Pilgrim's Progress may also refer to:

== Arts and entertainment ==
=== Film ===
- Pilgrim's Progress, a 1912 American film by Francis Powers
- Pilgrim's Progress , a 1978 American film by Ken Anderson
- The Pilgrim's Progress, a 2017 American film
- The Pilgrim's Progress (film), a 2019 American film
- Pilgrim's Progress: Journey to Heaven, a 2008 American film
- Miss Pilgrim's Progress, a 1949 British film

=== Literature ===
- The Third Part of the Pilgrim's Progress, a 1693 novel by an anonymous author
- The Innocents Abroad, or The New Pilgrim's Progress, a 1869 book by Mark Twain

=== Other uses in arts and entertainment ===
- The Pilgrim's Progress (opera), a 1951 opera by Ralph Vaughan Williams
- Pilgrim's Progress (song), a 1969 track by Procol Harum
- Pilgrims Progress (album), a 2010 album by Kula Shaker

== Other uses ==
- The Pilgrim Progress, a historical reenactment event in Plymouth, Massachusetts
- Pilgrim's Progress Road Bridge, a bridge in Rhinebeck, New York

== See also ==
- The Pilgrim's Regress, a 1933 novel by C. S. Lewis
