= Higden (disambiguation) =

Higden is a town in Arkansas.

Higden may also refer to:

- Henry Higden (fl. 1693), English poet and dramatist
- Ranulf Higden (c. 1280–1364), English chronicler and Benedictine monk
