= The Double Dealer =

1693 play by William Congreve

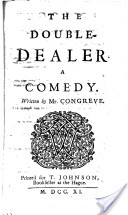
Frontispiece of the 1740 edition of The Double Dealer

The Double Dealer is a comic play written by English playwright William Congreve, first produced in 1693. Incidental music for the play was written by Henry Purcell.

== Characters and plot ==
This comedy sees character Mellefont, nephew and prospective heir of Lord Touchwood, about to marry Cynthia, daughter of Sir Paul Plyant. Lady Touchwood, a violent and dissolute woman, is in love with Mellefont, but as he rejects her advances, determines to prevent the match and ruin him in Lord Touchwood's esteem. In this design she finds a confederate in Maskwell, the Double Dealer, who has been her lover, pretends to be Mellefont's friend, and aspires to cheat him of Cynthia and get her for himself. To this end he leads Plyant to suspect an intrigue between Mellefont and Lady Plyant, and also leads Touchwood to suspect an intrigue between Mellefont and Lady Touchwood; and contrives that Touchwood shall find Mellefont in the latter's chamber.

Mellefont is disinherited and Cynthia is to be made over to Maskwell. The latter's plot, however, here goes wrong. Lord Touchwood informs Lady Touchwood of Maskwell's intention to marry Cynthia. This awakens her jealousy. She finds Maskwell and rebukes him, and is overheard by Lord Touchwood, who now perceives Maskwell's treachery, and defeats his final attempt to carry off Cynthia.

== Adaptations ==
On 14 May 1995, BBC Radio 3 broadcast a production directed by Phyllida Lloyd and featuring Robin Bailey as Lord Touchwood, Sheila Gish as Lady Touchwood, Jonathan Cullen as Mellefont, Clive Swift as Sir Paul Plyant, Penelope Wilton as Lady Plyant, Christopher Benjamin as Lord Froth, Celia Imrie as Lady Froth, Claire Skinner as Cynthia, Mark Lockyer as Brisk, Richard Bonneville as Careless and Robert Glenister as Maskwell.

== See also ==
- Restoration comedy
