= Sabiniano Manrique de Lara =

Spanish colonial administrator

24th Governor-General of the Philippines
- In office 25 July 1653 – 8 September 1663
- Monarch: Philip IV of Spain
- Governor: (Viceroy of New Spain); Luis Enríquez de Guzmán, 9th Count of Alba de Liste; Francisco Fernández de la Cueva, 8th Duke of Alburquerque
- Preceded by: Diego Fajardo Chacón
- Succeeded by: Diego de Salcedo

Personal details
- Born: baptized 17 May 1606 Málaga, Kingdom of Spain
- Died: 16 November 1679 (aged 73) Málaga, Kingdom of Spain
- Awards: Order of Calatrava

Sabiniano Manrique de Lara (baptized 17 May 1606 – 16 November 1679) was the Spanish governor-general of the Philippines from 1653 to 1663, the third longest-serving governor-general after Rafael María de Aguilar (governed 1793–1806), and Fausto Cruzat y Góngora (governed 1690–1701).

== Biography ==
He succeeded Spanish Governor-General of the Philippines Islands Diego Fajardo Chacon y Entenza, who served from 11 August 1644 to 25 July 1653. He was a cadet brother of the Juan Fajardo de Guevara, 1st Marquis of Espinardo, a title awarded by King Philip IV of Spain in 1626, the purchaser of former morisco populated lands, and may have been connected with the "Fajardo Chacón" Royal Accountants family, from the Murcia and Almeria lands, who obtained earlier the title of Marquis of Los Vélez, a title awarded by Queen Joan I of Castile "the Mad", in 1507.

The attacks on Manila in April 1662 of the Taiwanese – Chinese seafarer Koxinga, a.k.a. Koseng, who drove the Dutch from Taiwan, a.k.a. Formosa Island, prompted him to secure help from the Spanish soldiers settled at Zamboanga, 6° 54' 0″ N, 122° 4' 0″ E, a.k.a. Bagumbayan, Mindanao Island, since April 1635 to counteract Koxinga previsible military actions in Manila.

The Jesuit father Francisco Xavier Baranera records, however, Koxinga's death on 23 July 1662. On 8 September 1663, Manrique de Lara was replaced by Diego de Salcedo, who was chosen by the king on 2 December 1661, but effective 8 September 1663 – 28 September 1668. After his residencia, he returned to Malaga and became a priest.

== Literature ==
- Luis de Salazar : "Historia genealógica de la Casa de Lara", (1697), vol 2, pag. 872: (see: [https://books.google.com/books?id=z0M_AAAAcAAJ&pg=PA872 Salazar, Historia de la Casa Lara – Modern reprints of this monumental work can be found sometimes at the Spanish Government Public Libraries also.)
- Compendio de La Historia de Filipinas Por El P. Francisco X. Baranera de La ...

Author: Baranera, Francisco Xavier, Publisher: BIBLIOBAZAAR. Language: English, (????), ISBN 978-0554575919, August 2008 – 148 Pages Paperback. Found searching IT second hand bookshops.

- "Compendio de la historia de Filipinas" por el P. Francisco X. Baranera de la Compañia de Jesus ... Obra de texto para la 2.a enseñanza, Manila, 1884, 131 pp. in Spanish. The Philippines were under Spanish Administration over three centuries, till 1898, whereby Cuba, Puerto Rico and Philippines passed to U.S.A. Military Administration. Cuba, some 111,000 km^{2}., became fully independent on 20 May 1902.
- Template:Governor-General of the Philippines
