= Battles of La Naval de Manila =

Naval battle of the Eighty Years' War

- Part of the Eighty Years' War
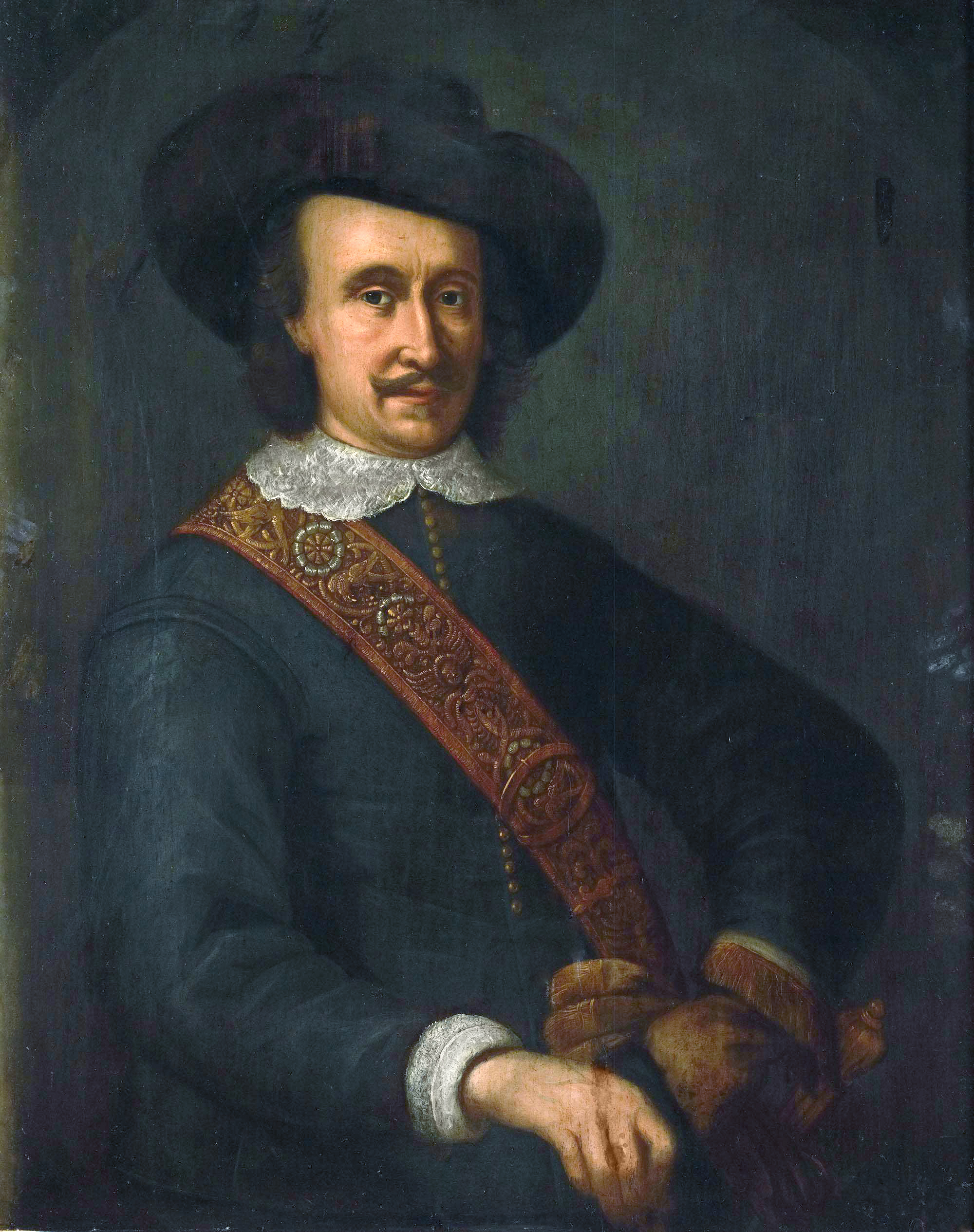
- Governor-General of the Dutch East Indies Cornelis van der Lijn
Date	March 15 – October 4, 1646
Location	Philippines
Result	Spanish victory

Belligerents
Spanish Empire; Spanish East Indies	Dutch Republic; Dutch East Indies

Commanders and leaders
Diego Chacón; Lorenzo Ugalde de Orellana; Sebastián López (Spain) Agustín de Cepeda; Cristobal Valenzuela; Francisco Esteyvar	Cornelis Lijn; Maarten Vries; Antonio Camb

Strength
8 ships; 3 Manila galleons; 1 galley; 4 brigantines; 400 soldiers; 68 guns	35 ships; 16 regular galleons; 3 fire ships; 16 launches; 470 guns (est.); Second Squadron; 800 soldiers

Casualties and losses
15 dead	500 dead 2 fire ships sunk 3 ships severely damaged

The Battles of La Naval de Manila or Battle of Manila Bay (Spanish: Batallas de las marinas de Manila) were a series of five naval battles fought in the waters of the Spanish East Indies in the year 1646, in which the forces of the Spanish Empire repelled various attempts by forces of the Dutch Republic to invade Manila, during the Eighty Years' War. The Spanish forces, which included many native volunteers, consisted of two, and later, three Manila galleons, a galley and four brigantines. They neutralized a Dutch fleet of nineteen warships, divided into three separate squadrons. Heavy damage was inflicted upon the Dutch squadrons by the Spanish forces, forcing the Dutch to abandon their invasion of the Philippines.

The victories against the Dutch invaders were attributed by the Spanish troops to the intercession of the Virgin Mary under the title of Our Lady of La Naval de Manila. On 9 April 1652, the victories in the five sea battles were declared a miracle by the Archdiocese of Manila after a thorough canonical investigation, giving rise to the centuries-old festivities of Our Lady of La Naval de Manila.

== Background ==
=== Early Spanish-Dutch conflicts in the Philippines ===
Pursuing their quest for alternative trade routes to Asia, the Dutch reached the Philippines and sought to dominate the commercial sea trade in Southeast Asia. Being at war with Spain, they engaged in privateering activities. They harassed the coasts of Manila Bay and its environs, and preyed on sampans and junks from China and Japan in an attempt to cut off Spanish trade with East Asia.

The first Dutch squadron to reach the Philippines was led by Olivier van Noort. On December 14, 1600, van Noort's squadron grappled with the Spanish fleet under Antonio de Morga near Fortune Island, where de Morga's flagship, the San Diego, sank. Van Noort managed to return to Holland, thus becoming the first Dutch to circumnavigate the world.

Another Dutch fleet of four ships under the command of François de Wittert tried to attack Manila in 1609, but was repelled by the Spanish governor-general Juan de Silva who launched a counterattack and defeated the Dutch at the Battle of Playa Honda, where was killed.

In October 1616, another Dutch fleet of 10 galleons under the command of Joris van Spilbergen (Georges Spillberg) blockaded the entrance of Manila Bay. A Spanish armada of seven galleons led by Juan Ronquillo battled against Spilbergen's fleet at the Playa Honda in April 1617 (known as the second Battle of Playa Honda). Spilbergen's flagship, the Sol de Holanda (Sun of Holland) sank, and the Dutch were once again repulsed with heavy damage.

From 1640 to 1641, a Dutch fleet of three ships stationed near Embocadero de San Bernardino tried to capture merchant galleons coming from Acapulco, Mexico. These galleons, however, escaped safely by taking a different route after receiving warnings from a system of fire-signals (placed in Embocadero) which was devised by the Jesuit priest Francisco Colin.

=== Planned invasion of the Philippines ===
A lithographic illustration of the Dutch harbour in Taiwan (after 1623).

In view of their previous failures to disrupt the Spanish Empire's trade in Asia, the Dutch decided to seize the Philippines, feeling certain that they were strong enough to carry out the attacks. From the time they conquered the Spanish settlement in the north of Formosa in 1642, the Dutch became increasingly eager to attack Manila because they knew the city lacked strong defenses and that it was unable to receive enough aid because the Spanish were occupied by the wars in Europe.

Fr. Juan de los Ángeles, a Dominican priest who had been taken from Formosa to Macassar by the Dutch as a prisoner of war, later described in his account that the Dutch were so eager to launch an attack on the Philippines that "they talk among themselves of nothing else than how they will gain Manila", and that "they have urgently requested more men from Holland for the purpose of attacking Manila. ". In his account, he also described the formidable force of the Dutch stationed at the ports of Jakarta in Indonesia and Formosa:

"The power which the Dutch enemy possess in those regions...is greater than we could imagine of them. According to what I myself have seen...the Dutch have at this time more than one hundred and fifty ships and pataches, at a moderate estimate—all equipped and provided by seamen, soldiers, artillery and other necessary supplies. "

=== Condition of the islands ===
The entire Philippines was already in dire situation at the time when the Dutch were planning their invasion.

- A series of volcanic eruptions took place between 1633 and 1640, as a food shortage also crippled the city.
- Wars against the Muslims of Mindanao led by Sultan Kudarat in 1635 and the Sangley Rebellion in 1639 to 1640 had taken its toll of lives and resources.
- Numerous wrecks and losses of sea vessels which sailed to and from New Spain (1638–39) did not only disrupted the Manila–Acapulco trade but also reduced the naval strength of Manila.
- After the Dutch seized Formosa in 1642, they began sending squadrons of vessels, both large and small—the former going to the Embocadero de San Bernardino and Cape Espíritu Santo to await the ships that carried relief for the Philippines, and the latter stationed on the coast of Ilocos and Pangasinan to pillage the trading vessels coming from China.

The new Spanish governor-general Diego Fajardo Chacón reached the Philippines at the end of June in 1644, together with the Andalusian Captain Sebastian López. Fajardo found the islands deficient in naval strength. Making his entrance into Manila by mid-August, Fajardo took possession of the government and dispatched two galleons--Nuestra Señora dela Encarnación and Nuestra Señora del Rosario (hereinafter called Encarnación and Rosario, respectively)—to acquire new resources for the islands from New Spain.

=== Catastrophic events in 1645 ===
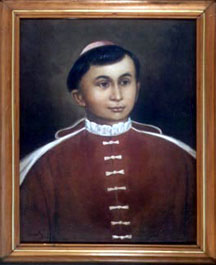
Msgr. Fernando Montero de Espinosa

==== Death of the Archbishop ====
In July 1645, the Encarnación and Rosario, under the command of the Viscayan Captain Lorenzo de Orella y Ugalde (also Lorenzo Ugalde de Orellana) arrived from Mexico at the port of Lamon Bay, with goods for the Philippines to replenish its depleted resources. Aboard in one of the two galleons was the archbishop-elect of Manila, His Grace Don Fernando Montero de Espinosa. On his way to Manila, de Espinosa was stricken by hemorrhagic fever and died. The citizens of Manila, who were in great need of a religious leader to strengthen their faith in those desperate times, sorrowfully mourned at the untimely death of de Espinosa.

==== The San w earthquake ====
On November 30, 1645, the feast of Saint Andrew the Apostle, a devastating earthquake struck Manila and its environs, destroying about 150 magnificent buildings and killing countless citizens. Five days later, on December 5, another earthquake as violent as the first rocked the city. Although no fatalities were recorded, the remaining unstable structures damaged by the first tremor were totally destroyed.

The destructive powers of the earthquake reached other provinces of the islands. Native villages were utterly overthrown, as their huts built of bamboos and nipa thatching were levelled. Great fissures and even chasms appeared in open fields, while rivers (including those in Manila) overflowed to flood the cities and villages following the aftershocks.

== Full-scale attack in 1646 ==
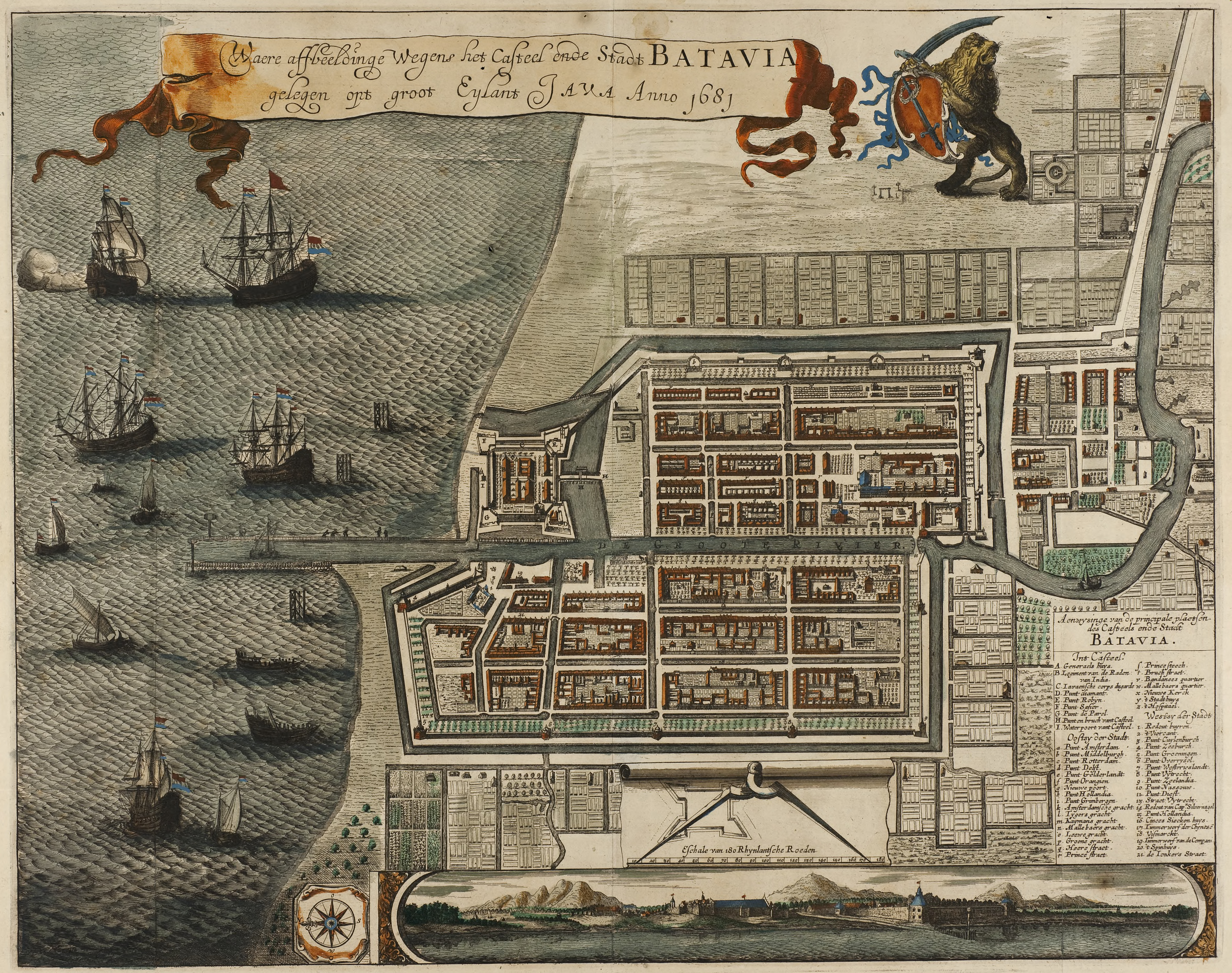
Drawing of Batavia (now Jakarta) in the 17th century.

In their great council in New Batavia (Jakarta), the Dutch decided to launch a decisive attack in the Philippines. The Dutch equipped 18 vessels under Maarten Gerritsz Vries, and divided them into three squadrons:

=== Dutch forces ===
First Squadron

- Strength: 5 vessels (4 regular ships and one small boat in the form of O called chó)
- Destination: Ilocos and Pangasinan
- Purpose: To stir up the natives against the Spaniards and to seize coastal boats and barges from China.

Second Squadron

- Strength: 7 vessels (5 regular ships and 2 fire ships), 16 launches, 800 soldiers; Artillery: The flagship carried 46 pieces of excellent artillery; the smallest vessels carried thirty.
- Destination: Zamboanga then to Embocadero de San Bernardino Strait
- Purpose: To snatch the vessels coming from Mexico, which annually brought to Manila considerable amount of money for the maintenance of the Spanish garrison in the archipelago.

Third Squadron

- Strength: 6 vessels; Artillery: Its flagship carried 45 guns, while others had over 20.
- Destination: Manila (as reinforcement of the first two squadrons)
- Purpose: To cut off any relief coming from Manila to Ternate and Makassar.

After monsoon, these three squadrons will then converge as one armada outside the bay of Manila to attack the city.

=== Spanish forces ===
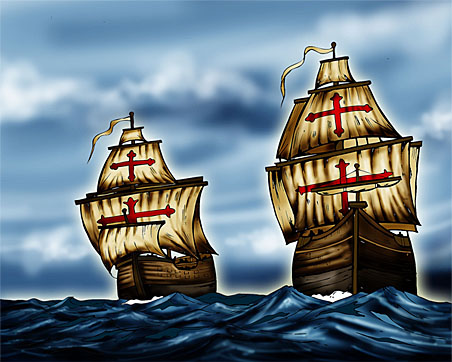
The two merchant galleons—the Encarnación and Rosario--which were hastily converted to warships to meet the superior Dutch armada of 18 vessels during the battles of La Naval de Manila in 1646. (From an artist's conception)

News of the arrival of the first squadron in Ilocos and Pangasinan region reached Manila on February 1, 1646. The Dutch tried to win over the Ilocanos and Pangasinenses, promising complete independence and abolition of taxes. However, when the natives resisted, the Dutch corsairs plundered their homes. The arrival of some companies of Spanish soldiers to those places, however, forced the Dutch to re-embark to their ships.

Learning the presence of the enemy, Governor Fajardo called for a council of war. At that time, Manila had no naval strength to repel the enemy—save for the two old and nearly-rotting Manila-Acapulco galleons, the 800-ton Encarnación and 700-ton Rosario—which arrived at Cavite from Mexico from the previous year. Despite being greatly outnumbered by the enemy, General Fajardo decided that the two galleons should be made ready for battle. The two galleons were hastily equipped and manned as follows:

	Encarnación	Rosario
Designation	Capitana (Flagship)	Almiranta (Admiral ship)
Artillery	34 bronze cannons (calibers: 18, 25 and 30)	30 cannons (calibers: same as the flagship)
Soldiery	200 men (100 musketeers; 40 seamen; 60 artillerist, laborers and servants)	(Same as the flagship)

Fajardo appointed the General Lorenzo Ugalde de Orellana as commander-in chief of the Spanish fleet (and thus making him captain of the flagship Encarnación), with Sebastián López as admiral (and captain of the Rosario). The appointed sergeant-major was Agustín de Cepeda.

The four companies of infantrymen were under the leadership of Captains Juan Enríquez de Miranda and Gaspar Cardoso on the flagship, and Captains Juan Martínez Capel and Gabriel Niño de Guzmán on the almiranta.

The chief pilots were Captain Domingo Machado with his associate Francisco Romero on the flagship, while on the almiranta were Captain Juan Martínez and his associate Andrés Cordero.

== Battles of 1646 ==
=== First battle ===
Arriving at the entrance of Mariveles, the Dutch squadron were nowhere to be found (contrary to the earlier reports of sentinels stationed at Mariveles).

The Spanish fleet then proceeded to Bolinao in Lingayen, Pangasinan. There, on March 15 at around 9:00 am, the Spanish fleet discovered one enemy vessel on oars, but it quickly took flight. At about 1:00 pm, four Dutch ships appeared, together with the smaller oared-vessel they had seen earlier. The two fleets came within firing range of each other between two and three o'clock in the afternoon.

The first salvo came from the Dutch flagship but missed its mark. The Encarnación answered with two shots, hitting the Dutch flagship with a 15 kg cannonball, tearing open the forward edge of the ship's prow. The Dutch then concentrated firing on the smaller ship Rosario, which retaliated by firing a simultaneous volley of cannons. The Encarnación fired freely at any of the four Dutch vessels, inflicting severe damages and thus forcing the Dutch to disengage in battle.

The battles lasted for five hours. At around 7:00 pm, four of the Dutch ships retreated in the dark with their lanterns out. The Dutch flagship almost sunk but also escaped under the cover of darkness. The Spanish fleet looked for the Dutch corsairs up to Cape Bojeador on the northern tip of Luzon, but the Dutch fleet completely disappeared.

The Spanish fleet sustained only minor damages. None of the men were killed and only few were wounded. The two Spanish galleons had been so heavily armed with cannon, cannonballs and ammunition that they had outgunned the Dutch ships.

The two ships stayed at the port of Bolinao to undergo some repairs. From there, General Orellana, after sending word to Governor Fajardo of their initial victory, received orders from the governor to escort and secure the safety of the merchant galleon from Mexico—the San Luis—which was calculated to reach the Philippines via Embocadero de San Bernardino on July 21. The merchant galleon, laden with goods from Mexico, could be a principal target of the Dutch corsairs.

Naval siege at Ticao Island

In mid-April, the second Dutch squadron had entered the Philippine waters. The Dutch first headed for Jolo, intending to attack the Spanish garrison in that place, but upon seeing that it was already abandoned (as ordered by Governor Fajardo to consolidate the Spanish force against the Dutch), the Dutch fleet then proceeded to another Spanish stronghold in Zamboanga, snatching two of the five ships that would carry the relief to Ternate in the Moluccas. The other three managed to escape.

The Dutch then attacked the stronghold of Zamboanga, but given its strong resistance, the corsairs landed their troops in Caldera to directly assault the fort, but they were driven back to their ships by Captain Pedro Durán de Monforte with 30 Spanish and two indigenous companies, causing more than a hundred casualties on the part of the Dutch.

News of the Dutch presence in Zamboanga reached the Spanish fleet, which had already docked at the Port of San Jacinto in Ticao Island (a long and narrow island northeast of Masbate Island, between the San Bernardino Strait and Ticao Passage) on June 1. The port where the two galleons anchored lies open to sea, in the form of a semicircle, and is entered by a passage through which vessels can pass only one after another.

The Dutch squadron, still stationed in Zamboanga awaiting the return of the other three ships which managed to escape their clutches, proceeded to San Bernardino, prompted by their previous orders from Batavia to seize any vessel coming from Mexico to the Philippines. On June 22, the seven Dutch warships and 16 launches were sighted by the sentinel approaching Ticao. The following day, June 23, the Dutch discovered the Encarnación and Rosario moored at the entrance of San Jacinto port. The Dutch decided to form a naval siege, blockading the entrance of the harbor with their own ships to prevent the two galleons from coming out.

It was decided after a council of war that the two ships should not engage in battle to save their ammunitions until the arrival of the San Luis to protect it at all cost. General Orellana then ordered sergeant-major Agustín de Cepeda with Captain Gaspar Cardoso as his aide, together with 150 infantrymen, to secure an elevated piece of land located near the entrance of the harbor, which might be used by the Dutch as a strategic point to ambush the two galleons. At 10 o'clock of June 23, four heavy armed boats of the Dutch approached the hill, but were driven back by the Spanish troops in a surprise attack.

Failing to secure the hill, the Dutch sent 10 launches to inflict some damage upon the two galleons, hoping to reduce the ammunitions of the Spanish fleet before the arrival of the San Luis. This strategy (which intermittently occurred throughout the span of the siege) also failed.

The standoff between the Spanish and Dutch fleets continued for a span of 31 days as both navies waited for the arrival of San Luis. By July 24, however, there was still no sign of the galleon. Antonio Camb, the commander of the second Dutch squadron, presumed that it had already made port somewhere in the archipelago. The Dutch lifted their siege and finally took the route to Manila.

=== Second battle ===
At dawn of July 25, the Feast of Saint James the Great, Patron of Spain, the Spanish fleet of two left the port of Ticao. When the sun finally rose they saw the Dutch squadron sailing away, bound to Manila. The Encarnación and Rosario wasted no time and chased the enemy, knowing that Manila was defenseless, with no ships to protect itself and all its artillery totally removed for use of the two galleons.

On one occasion, as reported by one of the soldiers aboard the Encarnación, Fr. Juan de Cuenca, O.P. seemed in a trance and then delivered "a very spiritual sermon" to the men, the content of which was "an assurance on the part of God and His Most Holy Mother, not only victory but also that no one would be killed in battle."

The two Spanish galleons caught up the seven Dutch warships between the islands of Banton and Marinduque on July 28, 1646, although no immediate hostilities ensued. Before the battle began, both General Orellana and Admiral López (without each other's knowledge), made public vows to the Virgin of the Rosary in the name of the entire armada, that if they come out victorious against the Dutch, they will make a solemn feast in Her honor, and all of them would walk barefoot to Our Lady's chapel at Santo Domingo Church, as a sign of thanksgiving.

The second battle (which according to the chronicles was the bloodiest) took place on July 29 at around 7:00 pm. The seven Dutch ships surrounded the Encarnación. The lone Spanish flagship exchanged fire violently against the Dutch, inflicting greater damage on the part of the corsairs. The Rosario was outside the circle of the Dutch and fired freely from behind causing greater destruction to the enemy.

At one point the Encarnación got entangled with the Dutch flagship, with the danger that the Dutch would board the flagship and force the outnumbered Spanish troops in hand-to-hand combat. The mariners of the Spanish flagship immediately rushed to cut the tangled ropes, freeing both ships.

The Dutch tried to blow up the Encarnación by sending one of their fire ships, but it was repulsed by a continuous volley of artillery from the Spanish flagship. It turned to the Rosario, but it too was met with ten simultaneous shots which ignited its fireworks. The fire ship burst into flames and sank, killing its crew.

The battle lasted till daybreak, and the Dutch fled. One man survived the sinking of the Dutch fire ship and was taken prisoner by the Spanish armada. As promised by Fr. de Cuenca, no man was killed in the Encarnación. The Rosario lost five men.

=== Third battle ===
The following day, the Spanish fleet pursued the enemy, which now had only six vessels including the remaining fire ship. The Dutch were cornered by the two ships on July 31, 1646 at around 2:00 pm, between the islands of Mindoro and Maestre de Campo (an island about 20 kilometers southeast of Mindoro), where the third battle took place.

The Spanish fleet took the offensive side as the Dutch were desperately defensive. The bombardment between the two navies, as one narrator described it, "became furious like the explosion of so many volcanoes." The Dutch then tried to disable the Rosario, but they were met by a heavy volley of cannon shots.

In desperation, the Dutch finally sent out their remaining fire ship. It was armed with 30 cannons but with no sail, so it had to be escorted by two other vessels and towed by some of the Dutch launches.

General Orellana ordered the musketeers to fire on the men who were directing the launches. At the same time, he ordered the artillery on the starboard side of his ship (to which the fire ship was coming) to continuously fire at the sides of the approaching vessel. The fire ship got badly battered and sank, bringing its crew and fireworks to the bottom of the sea.

As the fire ship sank, the men on the Spanish flagship shouted "¡Ave Maria!" (Hail Mary!) and "¡Viva la fe Cristo y la Virgen Santísima del Rosario!" (Long live the Faith in Christ and the Most Holy Virgin of the Rosary!) and continued shouting these words until the fire ship completely disappeared into the sea.

The battle continued till about the time of the Angelus at 6:00 pm. The Dutch once again fled into the night, with its flagship severely damaged. The sense of relief was overwhelming for the Spanish armada, that they publicly declared that it was the victory of Our Lady of the Rosary, and General Orellana "fell on his knees before an image of Our Lady and publicly gave thanks for the victory, acknowledging it as by Her hand."

Informed of the third victory, Governor Fajardo ordered the Spanish fleet of two to return to the port of Cavite for the much needed rest and repairs. After a six-month voyage, the victorious fleet reached Cavite in the latter part of August. As soon as they landed, the triumphant Spanish troops led by General Orellana marched barefooted to Santo Domingo Church in Manila, in fulfilment of their vow. They were acclaimed as heroes upon their arrival in the city.

General Orellana retired from service and was awarded by the Governor-General with one of the best encomiendas in the land, while the other officers were promoted in rank.

=== Fourth battle ===
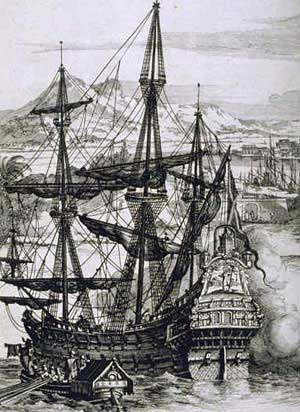
Example of an Atlantic Spanish galleon.

With their successive victories against the Dutch corsairs, the Spanish authorities in Manila presumed that the enemy had already abandoned their plan of invasion, that they confidently allowed the San Diego, a newly built merchant galleon bound for Mexico, to sail as far as San Bernardino Strait without having any ships to escort it.

Unbeknownst to the Spaniards, the first three of the six warships that consisted the third Dutch squadron had already entered the Philippine waters by the month of September of the same year, to join the rest of the earlier two Dutch squadrons, which—unknown to the commanders of these three ships—had already been defeated by the Spanish fleet.

General Cristoval Marquez de Valenzuela, commander of the San Diego, was surprised to discover the three Dutch ships stationed near Fortune Island in Nasugbu, Batangas. Seeing that the San Diego was not a warship, the Dutch corsairs attacked it furiously. The San Diego barely escaped the Dutch as it retreated towards Mariveles. Upon entering Manila Bay, the galleon proceeded to the port of Cavite to inform the Governor-General regarding the presence of the Dutch.

Governor Fajardo immediately ordered his sergeant major and infantry commander Manuel Estacio de Venegas to form a new Spanish armada, now composed of three galleons (the Encarnación, Rosario and San Diego, which was converted to a battleship), a galley (Spanish: galera) and four brigantines. The Encarnación and Rosario maintained its designations as flagship and admiral ship, respectively.

Reorganization in the military

With General Orellana's retirement, Sebastián López (former admiral and captain of the Rosario) was promoted as commander-in-chief of the entire armada (making him the new captain of the Encarnación). The former sergeant-major Agustín de Cepeda was elevated to the rank of admiral, and thus becoming Sebastián López's successor as captain of Rosario.

- Captain Francisco Rojo took the place of sergeant-major.
- Captains Salvador Pérez and Felipe Camino were given the command of the infantry in the Encarnación, while Juan de Mora and Francisco López Inoso had the same role in the Rosario.
- Admiral Francisco de Estéyvar took the command of the galley, which carried an infantry of one hundred men and equipped with a cannon amidships (carrying 35-pound balls) and several small culverins (carrying 14-pound balls). The four brigantines, which served as convoys of the galley, were placed under the command of Captains Juan de Valderrama, Juan Martínez Capel, Gabriel Niño de Guzmán and Francisco de Vargas Machuca. Each brigantine carried several musketeers and with a cannon at its prow.

The chaplaincy in the Encarnación was retained by the Dominicans; the Franciscans were assigned to the Rosario and an Augustinian friar to the galley.

Governor Fajardo ordered that the vow made during the three previous battles be renewed, as well as the continuity of the practice of reciting the Holy Rosary aloud in two choirs while keeling before the image of Our Lady.

On September 16, 1646, the Spanish armada sailed towards Fortune Island where Dutch presence had been reported, but the enemy was not there anymore. Sailing a little further towards Mindoro, the Spaniards sighted the Dutch corsairs nearby, between the Ambil and Lubang Islands.

The fourth battle began at around 4:00 pm. The wind was against the Spanish armada, so it had difficulty in approaching the enemy. The two navies were so far from each other that the bombardment was conducted with long range for five hours.

At around 9 o'clock, the current caused the Rosario to drift towards the enemy and it found itself surrounded by the three Dutch ships. The Encarnación had difficulty in approaching the Rosario to lend a hand, and for four hours, the lone admiral ship battled furiously against the three, forcing the Dutch corsairs to retreat and took shelter among the shoals near Cape Calavite.

=== Fifth battle ===
The final battle took place on October 4, 1646, the feast of Saint Francis of Assisi. Upon learning that the newly built San Diego had some defects, making it unable to continue its journey to Mexico, General López decided to bring the galleon back to Mariveles and await for Governor Fajardo's decision regarding the matter.

The San Diego was moored at Mariveles (together with the galley and the four brigantines), with the Encarnación guarding it from a distance, anchoring at the entrance of Manila Bay. The Rosario on the other hand, was carried far away by adverse currents (some two or three leagues from the two ships) and had difficulty in approaching the flagship (for in those places the force of the currents is irresistible).

Seeing that the three galleons were far from each other, the three Dutch ships ventured to attack once more. The Dutch ships, according to the chronicles, were of great size and well-armed. The enemy flagship had 40 cannons on its sides, not including those in rear and on the quarterdeck. The admiral's ship had less. The third vessel seemed to be a fireship due to its swiftness and the fireworks it carried.

General López decided not to move from his current position, as the Encarnación might also be carried away by the current like the Rosario, leaving the San Diego unguarded from the approaching Dutch corsairs. Instead, he waited for the Dutch to come nearer without raising the anchor, but loosened the cable with a buoy.

The Dutch came very close to the Encarnación with the danger that the corsairs would board the lone flagship. López then ordered the anchor to be raised, the ship's sails unfurled, and with the buoyed cables controlling the movement of the flagship, the Encarnación fired violently against the three Dutch ships, as all the four grappling vessels were carried by the current away from the San Diego.

The furious bombardment lasted for four hours. The Encarnación inflicted grave damages upon the enemy, forcing the Dutch corsairs once again to flee. As the Dutch fled, the wind suddenly stopped, giving chance to the galley under the command of Admiral de Estéyvar to attack the Dutch flagship (which was temporarily immobilized with the absence of the wind). Although outgunned, the galera fired upon the Dutch vessel "so furiously that the enemy regarded themselves as lost and the men attempted to throw themselves overboard."

The Dutch flagship was already in danger of sinking when the wind returned which helped the enemy in their escape. The Encarnación and the galera followed in hot pursuit, but the Dutch managed to flee by nightfall. There was no casualty on the Spanish galley, but four were killed in the Encarnación.

== Aftermath ==
The victorious armada returned once again to Manila to fulfill their vow of walking barefoot to the shrine of Our Lady of the Rosary within Santo Domingo Church in Intramuros.

On January 20, 1647, the victory was celebrated with a solemn feast by means of a procession, Mass and a parade of the Spanish squadron with other demonstrations in fulfilment of the vow made to the Virgin of the Rosary. After which, the city of Manila, after convening a council, made a new vow to celebrate the solemnity of the naval victories every year.

With the failure of the attempted Dutch conquest, the Philippines remained firmly under Spanish rule for several hundred more years until the 1896 Revolution and the 1898 Spanish-American War. Conversely, the Dutch did succeed in establishing themselves further south and created the Dutch East Indies, which would last until the mid-20th Century. The characters of the present-day nations of the Philippines on the one hand and Indonesia on the other is still deeply influenced by that outcome.

== Ecclesiastical investigations ==
On April 6, 1647, the priest Diego Rodríguez, O.P., Procurator-General of the Dominicans, on behalf of his Order duly requested the vicar of the Archdiocese of Manila to declare that the victories of 1646 had been miraculous intercession of the Virgin of the Rosary.

The City Council took into account the three following circumstances to declare the victories as miraculous:

- That only fifteen soldiers died on the side of the Spanish troops;
- That the two ships mentioned were already very old and powerless to do battle and;
- That the soldiers, who sought Divine assistance by means of devoutly praying the Holy Rosary in choirs, attributed the victory they achieved to God through the intercession of Our Lady of the Rosary;

== Declaration as miracle ==
On April 9, 1652, the battles of 1646 were declared miraculous by the Venerable Dean and Chapter and Ecclesiastical Governor in the then-sede vacante Archdiocese of Manila.

== See also ==
- Battle of Port of Cavite
