= Diego Fajardo Chacón =

Spanish military officer (c.1580–1658)

El Excelentísimo Diego Fajardo Chacón
- Born: around 1580; Madrid, Spanish Empire
- Died: October 7, 1658 (aged 77–78); Flagship Nuestra Señora de la Concepción, Pacific Ocean
- Relatives: Luis de Velasco y Vivero (father); Luisa Fajardo (mother); Alonso Fajardo de Entenza (grandfather)
- Military career
- Allegiance: (Spain) Spanish Empire
- Branch: Spanish Army on the Philippines
- Service years: 1639–1658
- Rank: Captain general
- Conflicts: Eighty Years' War: Battles of La Naval de Manila

23rd Governor-General of the Philippines
- In office 11 August 1644 – 25 July 1653
- Monarch: Philip IV
- Valido: Luis de Haro
- Viceroy of New Spain: García Sarmiento de Sotomayor; Marcos de Torres y Rueda (as acting); Matías de Peralta (as interim); Luis Enríquez de Guzmán
- Preceded by: Sebastián Hurtado de Corcuera
- Succeeded by: Sabiniano Manrique de Lara

Diego Fajardo Chacón was a Spanish military officer and governor of the Philippines, from August 11, 1644 to July 25, 1653.

== Background ==
A knight of the Order of Santiago, Diego Fajardo belonged to the house of the Marqués de los Vélez and was a nephew of the previous Philippine Governor, Alonso Fajardo de Entenza, who had held the position from 1618 to 1624.

Fajardo Chacón had been reared in the family of Emmanuel Philibert, Duke of Savoy, whose captain of the guard he had been. His valor in war led to promotions, both military and political. He became governor of Perpiñán (Perpignan) and of the Islas Terceras (Azores).

His character was assessed by his near-contemporary, the historian Fray Casimiro Díaz:

He was a gentleman of great abilities, which, had they not be accompanied by an excessive severity, uncommunicativeness, and too great rigor in his punishments, would have rendered him equal to the greatest governors, not only of these islands but of the whole world. For he was very intelligent in military affairs, but chaste, truthful, and modest, and so free from anything that can touch covetousness that in that respect he rather resembled a most observant religious than a military gentleman; for he was never known and he never presumed to receive anything — not only no jewel of value, but not even a present of any food. (Note: Casimiro Díaz, "The Augustinians in the Philippines, 1641–70", from his Conquistas, Manila, 1718, in)

== Arrival in the Philippines ==
Fajardo arrived as the new governor of the Philippines on the 1644 ship from New Spain (Mexico). He took office on 11 August 1644 (some sources say 16 August), and remained in the government for nine years. He was soon dominated by his secretary, Eustacio de Venegas, an old-time resident of Manila. For a time, Fajardo left the public affairs in the hands of Venegas, and himself retired to seclusion.

As soon as he assumed the government, in accordance with a royal decree, he moved the parián (settlement) of the Sangleys (Chinese-Filipino mestizos). He ordered that the governors' income from Sangley gambling be placed in the treasury. At the end of October, reinforcements were sent to Terrenate and other provinces.

He also imprisoned his predecessor, Sebastián Hurtado de Corcuera, based on a judicial inquiry (juicio de residencia) after Hurtado's term had ended. Hurtado spent five years in prison in the redoubt of Santiago, before an order was sent by the king to return him to Spain.

The 1644 galleon for New Spain had to put back to the Philippines because of great storms. The ship San Diego also put back to Cavite, because the Dutch had entered the Embocadero de San Bernardino (San Bernardino Strait). Dutch threats to the colony were greatly feared, partly because of their base in Formosa. The Dutch were said to have sent 200 ships with high freeboard (and additional smaller vessels) from the Cape of Good Hope to Formosa, and were thought to be preparing an attack on Manila, to take over the entire archipelago.

One of the first precautions was to send Francisco de Atienza y Báñez, a soldier from Toledo, as governor of Zamboanga, where he made peace with the Moros of Mindanao under Sultan Muhammad Kudarat. The continued fighting in Mindanao had been a severe domestic drain on Spanish strength, when it was needed to repel the Dutch. Atienza also later made peace in Jolo.

== Domination by Manuel Eustacio de Venegas ==
According to Casimiro Díaz, Fajardo was an upright man, but with two serious failings that damaged the effectiveness of his administration. First, he was so devoted to justice as to be incapable of showing mercy, which caused him to be greatly feared in the colony. Secondly, he was a solitary man, and did not relish taking an active role in government. This latter characteristic was so pronounced that Manuel Eustacio de Venegas, a rich citizen of Manila well connected by marriage, gained great control over the governor. According to Díaz, Fajardo "neither did nor commanded other than what his favorite desired."

Venegas grossly abused his power, arrogating to himself all the grandeur due to the governor alone, and enforcing his will against his enemies (religious as well as laymen) by violence, imprisonment, confiscation and exile. According to Bishop-elect of Nueva Segovia José Millán de Poblete,

Already so great was the number of those thrown into prisons, dungeons, and obscure cells, that all the places set aside by justice for the punishment of criminals were filled; and other new and frightful places, sites, and methods of delayed punishment were found inside the city. And when these places were also full, it was necessary to divide the prisoners among the provinces, villages, and presidios of these islands.

These abuses continued from 1644 through 1651. In the latter year Fray Jerónimo de Medrano, leader of the Augustinians in the Philippines, was able to convince Farjado that accusations of abuse by his surrogate warranted an investigation. Fajardo carried out the investigation, and on 16 September 1651 had Venegas arrested. Díaz says, "[H]e questioned him under torture, in which the prisoner answered nothing — either because of his great courage, or because he had taken some confection of opium... which has so narcotic a virtue that it renders those who drink it insensible to pain."

Fajardo took over the government for the last two years of his term. He was succeeded by Sabiniano Manrique de Lara in 1653.

== Events of 1645 ==
The two galleons Encarnación and Rosario from New Spain with reinforcements and much aid against the Dutch arrived in July 1645, having narrowly escaped three Dutch warships from Formosa. Don Fernando Montero de Espinosa, the new archbishop of Manila, arrived on the flagship, but he died suddenly just before making his triumphal entry into Manila. His body arrived, and entered by the same gate that his predecessor, Fray Hernando Guerrero, had used to leave for exile nine years before. The archdiocese remained without a head until the arrival of Miguel de Poblete in 1653.

The evening of 30 November 1645 (the day of St. Andrew, patron of the city), an earthquake immensely devastated Manila. 150 stone buildings were destroyed, and the remainder so badly damaged that they had to be demolished. An accurate enumeration of the dead was impossible, but 450 were known to be missing. The cathedral was totally destroyed. At an elegant chapel of the Society of Jesus adorned with pictures of the twelve apostles, there was considerable damage, but only one of the portraits fell — that of St. Andrew.

Fajardo was in his apartments, and narrowly escaped being buried. He lived for several months in a field tent in the Plaza de Armas, until a suitable wooden building was completed for him.

Five days later, on 5 December 1645 a second earthquake occurred, said to be of the same magnitude as the first. This time there were no fatalities, due to the fact that most of the buildings had already collapsed and the population was prepared. The city was left in such condition that one could not walk through it.

== The Dutch attack on Manila, 1646 ==
In 1646 the Dutch were believed to have sent 18 warships in three squadrons to converge on Manila. News of the first of these squadrons was received on 1 February 1646. The only ships available for defense were the galleons Encarnación and Rosario, recently arrived at Cavite from New Spain. These were well-armed, carrying 34 and 30 pieces of artillery, respectively, but they were only two ships against many. Nevertheless, it was determined to man and equip them for war. Fajardo named General Lorenzo de Orella y Ugalde commander-in-chief. Fajardo spoke to the men of the fleet on 3 March 1646 just before they weighed anchor.

The first battle occurred on 15 March 1646, off Mariveles Island, near Corregidor. The two Spanish ships defeated four Dutch ships, which, however, were able to escape in the night. None of the Spanish was killed, but the Spanish claimed to have learned later that many Dutch were killed, and two of the ships were rendered useless.

The Spanish galleons were then dispatched to await a relief ship from New Spain, the galleon San Luis, in the Embocadero, principal target of the Dutch. On the 24th, a squadron of seven Dutch warships blockaded the two Spanish galleons in a harbor on the island of Ticao. The blockade lasted more than a month, but was lifted when the Dutch sailed for Manila. General Lorenzo followed them with his two ships.

The second battle occurred on the night of the 29–30 July, between Banton and Marinduque. The battle lasted from 7 in the evening to daybreak. The Spanish lost six men killed, and destroyed one of the Dutch ships (a fireship that was unsuccessful in its attack).

The Spanish vessels pursued the Dutch, catching up with them on 31 July 1646 off the coast of Mindoro. Another terrific battle ensued, with the Dutch losing another fireship and having their flagship badly damaged. At dusk the Dutch fled towards land.

On the governor's orders, the Spanish galleons returned to Cavite in August, after a six months' voyage, where needed repairs were made. Fajardo rewarded General Lorenzo with one of the best encomiendas in the islands.

There still remained one Dutch squadron, waiting near Manila. The Encarnación and Rosario were now reinforced by the newly constructed San Diego, a galleon intended for New Spain, but now prepared for war. The three galleons sailed from Cavite on 15 September 1646, accompanied by a galley and four brigantines.

Another battle ensued shortly thereafter, with the Dutch again retreating. A further battle occurred on 4 October, with the same result.

== End of the Dutch threat ==
Although it was not known whether the Dutch would attack in 1647, given their defeats the previous year, nevertheless Governor Fajardo ordered that all possible defensive preparations be made, fortifying the city and ordering new warships to be built.

On 6 June 1647, Dutch vessels were sighted near Mariveles Island. In spite of the preparations, the Spanish had only one galleon (the San Diego) and two galleys ready to engage the enemy. The Dutch had twelve major vessels.

On 12 June the armada attacked the Spanish port of Cavite. The battle lasted eight hours, and the Spanish believed they had done much damage to the enemy flagship and the other vessels. The Spanish ships were not badly damaged and casualties were low. However, nearly every roof in the Spanish settlement was damaged by cannon fire, which particularly concentrated on the cathedral. On the 19th, the armada was split, with six ships sailing for the shipyard of Mindoro and the other six remaining in Manila Bay.

The Dutch next attacked Pampanga, where they captured the fortified monastery, taking prisoners and executing almost 200 Filipino defenders. (Note: Joseph Fayol, "Affairs in Filipinas, 1644-47", in) The governor ordered solemn funeral rites for the dead and payments to their widows and orphans.

This year was the last in which the Dutch attacked the Manila area. There was an expedition the following year that arrived in Jolo in July. The Dutch had formed an alliance with an anti-Spanish king, Salicala. The Spanish garrison on the island was small, but survived a Dutch bombardment. The Dutch finally withdrew, and the Spanish made peace with the Joloans, and then also withdrew.

There was also an unsuccessful attack on Zamboanga in 1648. That year the Dutch promised the natives of Mindanao that they would return in 1649 with aid in support of a revolt against the Spanish. Several revolts did break out, the most serious being in the village of Lindáo. There most of the Spaniards were killed, and the survivors were forced to flee in a small river boat to Butuán. (Note: Luis de Jesús and Diego de Santa Theresa, "Recollect Missions, 1646–1660", in) However, Dutch aid did not materialize.

The authorities from Manila issued a general pardon, and many of the Filipinos in the mountains surrendered. However, some of those were hanged and most of the rest were enslaved.

On 2 October 1649 the galleon Encarnación was wrecked at Sorsogon, en route from Acapulco.

== Notes ==
Political offices
Preceded by Sebastián Hurtado de Corcuera	Spanish Governor-General of the Philippines; 1644–1653	Succeeded by Sabiniano Manrique de Lara
