= The Pilgrim Progress =

Historical reenactment

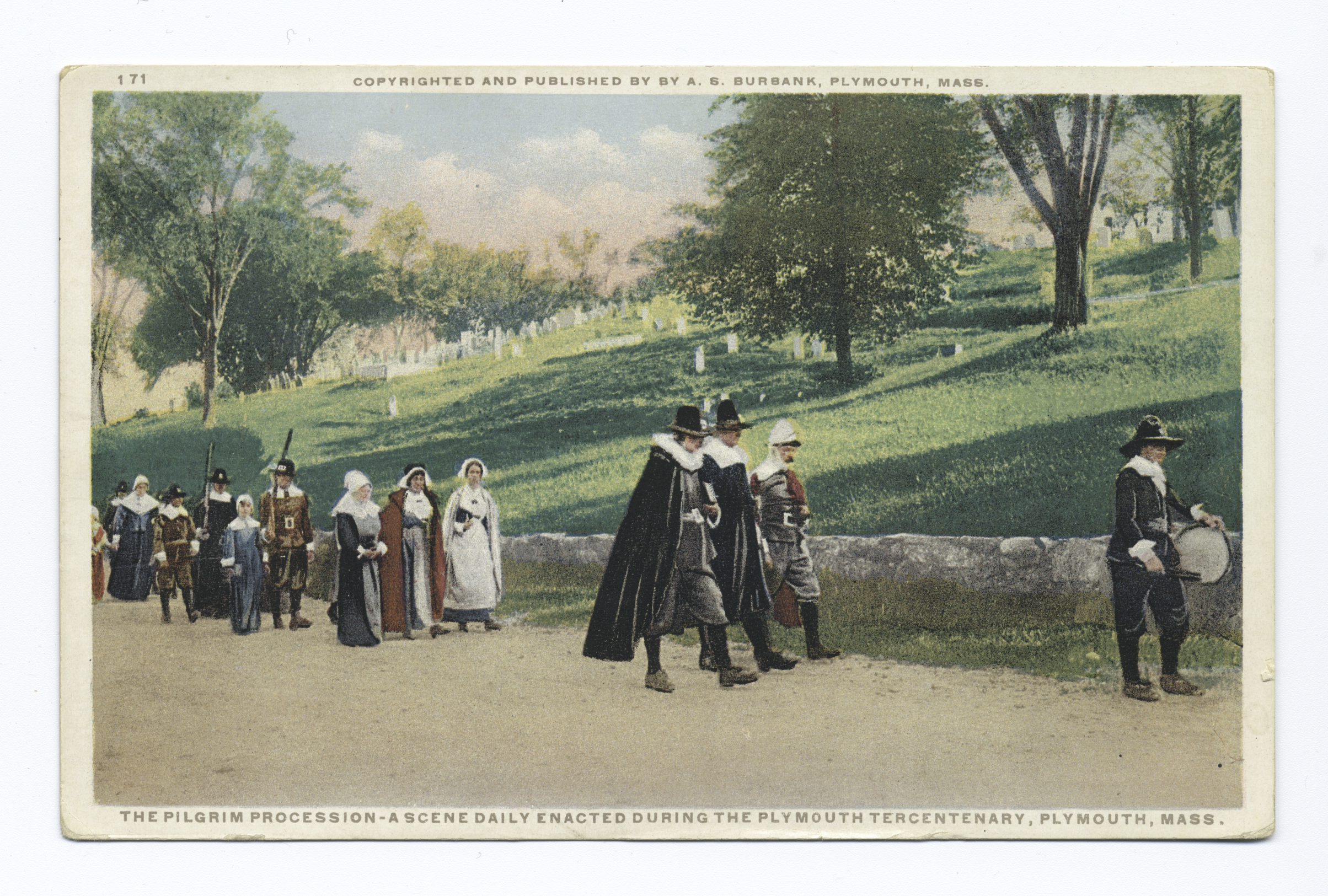
Enacted daily during the Plymouth Tercentenary

The Pilgrim Progress is a reenactment of the procession to church for the 51 surviving Pilgrims of the first winter in 1621. The reenactment was instituted by the Town of Plymouth, Massachusetts in 1921 in honor of its Pilgrim founders. The march takes place on the first four Fridays in August and is an integral part of the Town's celebration of Thanksgiving Day.

Each marcher represents one of the 51 survivors of the first harsh winter of 1620–1621. The historical setting for this reenactment is taken from the account of a Dutch visitor, Isaack de Rasieres, secretary of the Dutch colony of New Netherland, who visited Plymouth in 1627 and described the Pilgrims gather for worship thus:

Upon the hill they have a large square house…the lower part they use for their church where they preach on Sundays and the usual holidays. They assemble by beat of drum, each with musket or firelock, in front of the captain’s door; they have their cloaks on, and place themselves in order, three abreast and are led by a sergeant without beat of drum. Behind comes the Governor, in a long robe; beside him on the right hand comes the preacher with his cloak on, and on the left hand, the captain with his side arms and cloak on and with a small cane in his hand; and so they march in good order, and each sets his arms down near him. Thus they are constantly on their guard day and night.

The line of march proceeds past Plymouth Rock and up the First Street (Leyden Street today) to the top of Burial Hill where a short Pilgrim worship service is observed on the site of that original fort/meetinghouse. The Psalms sung are taken from The Book of Psalms translated by Henry Ainsworth that was used by the Pilgrims in Holland and in Plymouth. The passages read by Elder Brewster are usually from Governor Bradford's “History” or other Pilgrim source. This is faithfully re-lived the Sabbath procession of the Pilgrims to worship.

== The order of the march ==
| Character | Approx. Age | Description |
|---|---|---|
| Elder William Brewster | 54 | One of the leaders of the Pilgrims in Scrooby, England and Leyden in the Netherlands. Secret meetings of the Separatists began in Brewster's home, Scrooby Manor. He was an elder of the Pilgrim church until his death in 1643 “near fourscore years of age” |
| Governor William Bradford | 30 | One of the original Scrooby Congregation. Orphaned at and early age, he lived with relatives and left home to join the Separatist group and went to Leyden. His first wife, with whom he had one son, died the first winter in the New World. He married again and had four children. He was governor of Plymouth Colony for many years and wrote “History of Plimoth Plantation.” He died at the age of 67. |
| Captain Myles Standish | 36 | A professional soldier who was in charge of the colony's military affairs. His wife Rose died the first winter and he then married – by tradition – her younger sister Babara who came over on the Anne; they had five children. He was the only Pilgrim leader who never joined the Separatist church. He settled in Duxbury, Massachusetts and was assistant governor from 1633 until his death at the age of 72. |
| Mrs. Catherine Carver | 40 | Wife of John Carver, the first governor of Plymouth Colony. Her husband died the first spring, and she died the first summer. Her sister Bridget was the wife of the congregation's revered spiritual leader Pastor John Robinson. |
| Desire Minter | 18 | Lived with the Carvers. She was not well and later returned to England. |
| Maid | 18 | Married in America and died soon after. It is possible that she was Dorothy, second wife of Francis Eaton. |
| John Howland | 27 | Servant in the Carver household, fell overboard from the Mayflower during a storm. By the providence of God, he grabbed onto a rope and was pulled up by a boat hook. He married Elizabeth Tilley and they had 10 Children. He died about 80 years old. He was an assistant governor from 1629 to 1635. |
| William Latham | ? | Was a boy in the Carver household. He remained her 29 years before going back to England, then to the Bahamas where he was marooned and starved to death. |
| Steven Hopkins | 40 | An adventurous man, was the only Pilgrim with personal knowledge of the New World – he was shipwrecked in Bermuda on his way to Virginia in 1609–10. Later, he was often in trouble with the authorities. He lived over 20 years in Plymouth and had five children born there. He was an assistant governor, 1624 to 1636. |
| Mrs. Elizabeth Hopkins | 30 | When she boarded the Mayflower, was “big with child” – her son Oceanus was born aboard while at sea. She lived over 20 years in Plymouth |
| Giles Hopkins | 13 | Later married Catherine Wheldon and had five children. He moved to Eastham and died there in 1690. |
| Constantia Hopkins | 15 | Later married Nicholas Snow and had 12 children. She died in Eastham about 73 years old. |
| Damaris Hopkins | 4 | Died young. |
| Oceanus Hopkins | 1 | Born aboard the Mayflower, died young. |
| Isaac Allerton | 34 | His wife Mary died aboard the anchored Mayflower the first winter, a month after delivering a stillborn son; they had five children. Isaac married Fear Brewster, daughter of Elder Brewster; they had two children. He was a prominent man among the Pilgrims but stole some money and was dismissed from Plymouth Colony in disgrace. He died in New Haven, CT in 1659. |
| Bartholomew Allerton | 8 | Later returned to England. He married, became a minister, and died there. |
| Mary Allerton | 3 | Later married Elder Thomas Cushman who arrived aboard the Fortune; they had four children. When she died in Plymouth at about 80 years old, she was the last survivor of the Mayflower Passengers. |
| Remember Allerton | 5 | Later married Rev. Moses Maverick, pastor at Marblehead, Massachusetts, in about 1633. She died about 1655. |
| John Billington | 40 | Was father of two sons. In 1630, he was executed by hanging for committing murder – the first execution in Plymouth Colony. |
| Mrs. Ellen Billington | 37 | After John's death married Gregory Armstrong in 1638. |
| John Billington Jr. | 13 | Lost himself in the woods and turned up with a tribe of Native Americans on Cape Cod in 1621, leading to the Pilgrim's acquaintance with that tribe. He died before 1630. |
| Francis Billington | 11 | Almost blew up the Mayflower in Provincetown Harbor by shooting off squibs near some powder kegs. He also “discovered” Billington Sea, a lake behind the Plymouth settlement. He married Mrs. Christian (Penn) Easton, a passenger on Anne. They had several children. He moved to Middleboro, Massachusetts, where he died. |
| Francis Cooke | 38 | Came aboard the Mayflower with his son John; his wife Hester and 3 other children arrived in the Anne in 1623. He died in Plymouth in 1663. |
| John Cooke | 14 | Later married Sarah Warren. A deacon of the Plymouth church from 1634 to 1651, he was excommunicated in 1657 for turning Baptist during some religious troubles. He moved to the town of Dartmouth, Massachusetts and became a Baptist preacher. He died in 1695, next after Mary Allerton Cushman in Mayflower passenger longevity. |
| Joseph Rogers | 17 | His father Thomas died the first winter and a brother and sister came over later. He married Hannah and had 8 children. He moved to Eastham, Massachusetts in 1644, dying there in 1678. |
| Mary Brewster | 50 | Wife of Elder William Brewster, a spiritual leader of the Pilgrims. Although she had five children, only the two youngest sons came on the Mayflower; the remaining children eventually came to Plymouth. She died in 1627, age about 59. |
| Love Brewster | 9 | Later married Sarah Collier and had four children. He moved to Duxbury, Massachusetts and died there in 1650. |
| Wrestling Brewster | 6 | Died a young man |
| Richard More | 6 | Was an orphan boy whose brother and two sisters died the first winter. He later married twice and had 7 children. He died in Salem, Massachusetts |
| Elizabeth Tilley | 14 | Lost her parents the first winter. She married John Howland and had 10 children. She died in 1687 in Swansea, Massachusetts |
| Humility Cooper | 2 | A cousin of Edward Tilley. She went back home to England some time after 1623 |
| Henry Sampson | 17 | Was one of two "small cousins" brought along by the Tilleys. Married Ann Plummer and had 9 children. He moved to Duxbury, Massachusetts and died there in 1684. |
| Samuel Fuller, II | 12 | Was the orphan nephew of Dr. Fuller - his parents died the first winter. He married Jane Lothrop in Scituate, Massachusetts and had many children. Moved to Barnstable, Massachusetts in 1640 and died there in 1683 |
| Edward Winslow | 25 | Lost his wife that first winter, he later married Mrs. White. He made many voyages to England on Plymouth Colony affairs and was three-time governor of the Colony. He was the only pilgrim whose portrait exists. |
| Richard Warren | 40 | Deacon of the church in Leyden and Plymouth from 1609 to 1633; he was surgeon for the colony. His wife Bridget came over on Anne in 1623; had two children here. He died in the smallpox epidemic in Plymouth in 1633. |
| Richard Gardiner | 21 | Became a seaman and died at sea |
| Peter Browne | 20 | Married twice and died in 1633 |
| Francis Eaton | 25 | Lost his wife the first winter but their infant son Samuel survived. He was a carpenter and shipwright. He married his second wife about 1622; married his 3rd wife Christian Penn of the Anne in 1626 and had 4 children; he died in 1633 of the smallpox epidemic. |
| Samuel Eaton | 1 | Later married twice; he married Martha Billington in 1661, his stepmother's daughter by Francis Billington. He died in Middleboro, Massachusetts in 1684 |
| Mrs. Susanna (White) Winslow | 31 | Her husband died the first winter, leaving her with two sons. She married Edward Winslow in the first wedding in Plymouth, MA; their son Josiah Winslow was governor of Plymouth 1673–1680. She died in 1680. |
| Resolved White | 5 | Married Judith Vassall of Scituate, Massachusetts in 1640 and settled there for a while, then moved to Marshfield, Massachusetts in 1662. They had 5 children. He married Abigail Lord in 1674 and died in Salem, Massachusetts sometime after September 1687. |
| Peregrine White | infant | Born on the Mayflower in Provincetown, Massachusetts Harbor. He became captain of the militia. He married Sarah Bassett and had 7 children. He lived in Marshfield, Massachusetts where he died in 1704, aged 83 years. |
| Mary Chilton | 14 | Lost her mother and father the first year. She married John Winslow, brother of Edward, and had 10 children. She moved to Boston, MA and died there in 1679. |
| Priscilla Mullen | 18 | Lost her father, mother, and brother the first winter. She married John Alden and had 10 children. She died in Duxbury, Massachusetts in 1685. |
| Edward Doty | 21 | Servant to Mr. Hopkins. Aggressive and quarrelsome, he fought the first and last duel in Plymouth in 1621 with Edward Lester. He became a freeman early. He married Faith Clarke, had 9 children, and died in Plymouth in 1655. |
| Edward Lester | 21 | Also a servant to Mr. Hopkins. Went to Virginia and died there. |
| George Soule | 24 | Servant to Edward Winslow. He quickly rose to prominence after he gained his freedom. He married Mary Becket of the Anne and had 8 children. He died in Duxbury, Massachusetts in 1680. |
| Gilbert Winslow | 21 | Third brother of Edward Winslow, stayed a few years and moved back to England |
| John Alden | 21 | A cooper, he was hired in England to care for the barrels and was free to go or stay. He stayed to marry Priscilla Mullins and had 10 children. He died in Duxbury, Massachusetts in 1687. |
| John Crackstone | ? | He came with his father, who died the first winter. 5 or 6 years later he got lost in the woods and died from exposure. |

The Pilgrim Progress is sponsored by Plymouth Rock Foundation. This event is funded in part by the Town of Plymouth Promotions Fund.
