= Henry Higden =

English poet and dramatist

Henry Higden (fl. 1693), was an English poet and dramatist.

Higden was a Yorkshireman, and a member of the Middle Temple. He is represented as a man of wit and the companion of all the choice spirits of the town. In 1686 he published A Modern Essay on the Thirteenth Satyr of Juvenal, and in 1687 A Modern Essay on the Tenth Satyr of Juvenal. To the latter are prefixed complimentary verses of John Dryden, Aphra Behn, and Elkanah Settle. He also wrote a comedy entitled The Wary Widdow, or Sir Noisy Parrat, to which Sir Charles Sedley contributed a prologue. It was performed in 1693 at Drury Lane, but lasted only one night: The Poetical Register reported that Higden had introduced so much punch-drinking into it that "the actors got drunk, and were unable to go through with it, the Audience was dismiss'd at the close of the third act". In his preface to the printed edition of the play (1693) he makes a splenetic attack on William Congreve's The Old Bachelor, which had appeared during the same year.
