= The Third Part of the Pilgrim's Progress =

The Pilgrim's Progress: The Third Part
- 1761 title page
- Author: Anonymous
- Language: English
- Genre: Christian, allegorical
- Publisher: "all the booksellers"
- Publication date: 1693
- Publication place: United Kingdom
- Media type: Print (hardback)
- Preceded by: The Pilgrim's Progress: The Second Part by John Bunyan

Tender-Conscience awakened by lightning while detained in the palace of Carnal-Security.

The Pilgrim's Progress: The Third Part is a pseudepigraphic sequel to John Bunyan's 1678 novel The Pilgrim's Progress, written by an anonymous author. It was published with Bunyan's work in editions from 1693 to 1852 because it was believed to be written by Bunyan. It presents the pilgrimage of Tender-Conscience and his companions. In the 19th century it was bowdlerized to omit a few sexual situations and allusions.

== Plot ==
Tender-Conscience, a native of the town of Vain Delights goes on the pilgrimage of Christian and Christiana to the Celestial City. He stops at some of the same places as they, but he encounters new places not visited by either Christian or Christiana and her party.

All of the lands that are outside of the Wicket Gate and the area encompassed by the "walls and borders of that region, wherein lay the way to the heavenly country" are known as the "Valley of Destruction." The time that Tender-Conscience begins his pilgrimage is a time of drought and heat, which is emblematic of a time of the persecution. Some of them are deterred in their progress, and return to their old homes in the Valley of Destruction during the night.

Tender-Conscience has a difficult time crossing the Slough of Despond, and he does not get by it without being covered in mud from it. This mud has the effect of weakening the body and blinding his eyes, and Tender-Conscience gropes along until he is overshadowed by a bright cloud from which a hand appears that washes away the mud enabling Tender-Conscience to continue his journey with vigor.

At the Wicket Gate Tender-Conscience does not escape the arrows shot against callers from Beelzebub's castle. These stick to his flesh and cause him to bleed profusely. Good-Will lets him in, and registers his name as a pilgrim. He gives Tender-Conscience a crutch that is made of wood from the Tree of Life (Lignum Vitæ). This crutch staunches the bleeding and strengthens Tender-Conscience, who must bear with the arrows of Beelzebub until he reaches the House of the Interpreter.

The Interpreter removes the arrows of Beelzebub from Tender-Conscience's body and lodges him for the night, showing him the same emblems and scenes enjoyed by Christian, Christiana, and their children and companions. The next day the Interpreter goes a little way with Tender-Conscience to where the King's Highway is walled on either side by the Wall of Salvation. Before they reach this wall they come to two farms on either side of the way. The farm on the right is well-cared for and the one on the left is not. The Interpreter tells Tender-Conscience that this provides an example to pilgrims that they should be like the caretaker of the farm on the right, who gradually improved his farm until it was in its present good condition.

Tender-Conscience when parted from the Interpreter comes to the place where Christian found the cross and the sepulchre. On either side of the cross were now erected two houses as competing lodging places for pilgrims. On the right was the House of Mourning, and on the left was the House of Mirth. The House of Mirth is like an ale house with carousing men, but the House of Mourning is tended by pious women called "matrons." Tender-Conscience decides to go to the House of Mourning despite the agitation induced in the men of the House of Mirth, who form a mob surrounding the House of Mourning demanding that Tender-Conscience be handed over to them. Three shining ones appear to Tender-Conscience promising to rescue him. The first shining one breathes on Tender-Conscience making him a new creature, the second clothes him in a white robe in place of his crimson clothes, and the third one gives him a sealed roll. With this change Tender-Conscience is able to get by unrecognized by the men from the House of Mirth and, so, go on his way.

At the Hill Difficulty Tender-Conscience had the choice of the three ways: the one going up the hill also called "Difficulty," the one going around the right hand of the hill called "Danger," and the one going around the left side of the hill called "Destruction." The broadness and pleasantness of the two byways induced Tender-Conscience to take the right-hand byway Danger. He thought that this way would also lead him to the top of the hill, but the growing denseness of the forest surrounding the way and the howlings of wild beasts that he heard induced him to go back to the foot of the hill. He then remembered the Bible passages that characterized the right way as narrow, so he chose to go up the hill by way of the steep and narrow path.

Working his way up the hill, he is taken into two caves tended by Good-resolution and Contemplation where he is shown alabaster statues of famous pilgrims from the Bible who had gone on before, and an image of the Celestial City from a carved diamond. He is given respite and food by Good-Resolution, who warns him about places he should avoid staying while on the hill, and then he continues on the path, where he is stopped by a flattering man Spiritual-Pride, who convinces him there is a quicker way to his award, and leads him to a tower of Lofty-Thoughts with the plans of throwing Tender-Conscience off it, and dashing upon the bottom of the hill below. Tender remembers the warnings from Good-resolution, and he runs away, going on further he is stopped by an old man, Carnal-Security, who also convinces him to turn from the road, and he leads to a grand palace tended by the old man's wife Intemperance and his daughters Wantonness and Forgetfulness, where he is enticed to drink wine, dabbles with Wantonness and fall asleep in Forgetfulness' arms. Servants carry him inside and put him on a bed, and music begins to play with the intent of keeping him asleep until he dies, in which case his corpse would be carried down the hill to the path of Destruction, tossed into the fiery Lake of Destruction at the end of the road and die the 'second death'. Tender's crutch awakens him, and he gets up, and a storm and voices in his ear urge him to escape. On the way he runs into Gluttony who tries to get him stay for a feast that is prepared for him; avoiding that, he runs into the old man, who tries to convince him to stay, and if he will not to take another drink of the grapes before he leaves. Tender continues to run from the debate, and as he passes the fountain in the palace courtyard Wantonness, who is bathing in it, arises out naked and tries to seduce Tender. He narrowly avoids her grasp to escape, and run back to the main highway on the hill, and reaches the House Beautiful and is let in due to his pass.

At the palace, Tender has long conversations with the virgins Discretion, Charity, Prudence, and Piety about how he escaped danger on the way up the hill, and then is taken to a feast, where he was served by others of the society (Temperance, Decency, Frugality and Bounty). He then has a conversation on how they came to that place themselves to take on their positions (they were devotees to the woman Religion who originally lived there, and promised to keep her rules), and the discussion of the role of healthy food and moderation in a Christian lifestyle.

Tender sets off again, reaching the Valley of Humiliation, which has been covered with traps, nets and gins set up by the prince of the air, to stop high-minded pilgrims from proceeding further. Tender realizes he has to crawl under them in order to make any progress. He reaches a bridge, and is met with men in rowboats he thought might be murderers and robbers who infested the place. They began to shoot arrows at him, some of which missed him, and others which hit the shield he had received from House Beautiful. The men shooting at him included Worldly-honour, Arrogancy, Pride, Self-conceit, Vain-glory, and Shame. The last of these wounded him in his cheek, but barely drew blood. He continued on until he was past the bridge, and could again walk upright, and then praised the Lord.

Tender finally reached the Valley of Shadow of Death...

== Context ==
The first part of the Pilgrim's Progress was very popular and elicited many anonymous second parts, few of which survive. Bunyan appeared to intend to write a third part but died before it could be completed. This false third part was denounced as early as 1708 but remained quite popular.
