= Battle of Playa Honda =

1617 naval battle

Coordinates: 15°17′N 119°50′E

- Part of the Eighty Years' War
Date	14 – 15 April 1617
Location	Botolan, Captaincy General of the Philippines
Result	Spanish victory

Belligerents
(Spain) Spanish Empire: Philippines	Dutch Republic

Commanders and leaders
(Spain) Juan Ronquillo del Castillo	(Dutch Republic) Joris van Spilbergen

Strength
10 ships: 7 galleons; 3 galleys	10 ships

Casualties and losses
1 galleon	3 ships

The naval Second Battle of Playa Honda (Spanish: Segunda La Batalla Naval de Playa Honda; Filipino: Ikalawang Labanan sa Playa Honda), was the first of three known minor conflicts during the Eighty Years' War between the Dutch Republic and Spain held in Playa Honda (present-day Botolan) in the Philippines.

All the battles were won by the Spanish. The first battle occurred in 1610. The second and most famous took place in 1617. The third battle took place in 1624.
