= Casimiro Díaz =

For the player, see: Casimiro Diaz (baseball).

Fray Casimiro Díaz Toledano OSA (1693–1746) was a Spanish Augustinian friar who accompanied the first Spanish expedition to the Cordillera, situated on the island of Luzon in the Philippines.

Díaz wrote Conquistas de las Islas Philipinas in 1718 (published in Valladolid in 1890). He also wrote Parrocho (1745). Casimiro Díaz reported, "The Igorots are a barbaric people."

== Life and work ==
Casimiro Díaz was born in Toledo, Spain in 1693. He took his vows in the convent of San Felipe el Real in 1710, and after arriving at the Philippines, he finished his literary studies. Díaz was stationed in the missions at Magalang (1717), later in Mexico (1728), 6 years later in Aráyat (1734), Betis (1735), Minalin (1737), and Candaba (1740). He was procurator-general (1719), twice provincial secretary (1722), definitor (1725), presiding officer of the chapter (1731), qualifier of the Holy Office, chronicler of the Augustinian province in the islands, reader (1744), and conventual preacher. Díaz died in Manila in 1746, having completed many writings.
