= Ma-i =

Ancient sovereign state in the Philippines

Ma-i Mait
- before 971 AD–after 1339 AD (last historical reference)
- Status: Sovereign state which conducted trade with Brunei, and with the Song and Yuan dynasties
- Capital: Under debate Possibilities include Bulalacao, on the island of Mindoro, and Bay, Laguna
- Government: Monarchy
- History
  - Established: before 971 AD
  - Mentioned in a Song dynasty list of states conducting trade in the south seas: 971 AD
  - Noted by Song dynasty records as having brought trade goods to the southern Chinese coast: 982 AD
  - Described in detail in an account of countries conducting trade with the Yuan dynasty: 1339 AD
  - Disestablished: after 1339 AD (last historical reference)
- Currency: Barter ("caldrons, pieces of iron, red cloth or taffetas of various color stripes, ivory, and "tint or the like"")
Succeeded by
Captaincy General of the Philippines
- Today part of: Philippines

Ma-i
- Traditional Chinese: 麻逸
- Simplified Chinese: 麻逸
Transcriptions
Standard Mandarin
- Hanyu Pinyin: máyì
- Wade–Giles: ma^{2}-i^{4}
Southern Min
- Hokkien POJ: mâ-i̍t

Mait (also spelled Maidh, Ma'I, Mai, Ma-yi, or Mayi; Baybayin: ᜋᜁ; Hanunoo: ᜫᜡ; Hokkien Chinese: 麻逸; Pe̍h-ōe-jī: mâ-i̍t; Mandarin Chinese: 麻逸; pinyin: máyì; Wade–Giles: ma^{²}-i^{⁴}), was a medieval sovereign state located in what is now the Philippines.

Its existence was first documented in 971 in the Song dynasty documents known as the History of Song, and it was also mentioned in the 10th-century records of the Bruneian Empire. Based on these and other mentions until the early 14th century, contemporary scholars believe Ma-i was located either in Bay, Laguna, or on the island of Mindoro.

Research by Fay Cooper Cole for the Field Museum in Chicago in 1912 showed that the ancient name of Mindoro was Mait. Mindoro's indigenous groups are called Mangyans, and to this day, the Mangyans call the lowlands of Bulalacao, Oriental Mindoro Mait. For most of the 20th century, historians generally accepted the idea that Mindoro was the political center of the ancient Philippine polity. However, a 2005 study by Filipino-Chinese historian Go Bon Juan suggested that the historical descriptions better match Bay, Laguna (pronounced Ba-i), which is written similarly to Ma-i in "Chinese orthography" according to Go Bon Juan's understanding. Although in Hokkien Chinese, the literary reading for the first character, 麻, is "mâ", while the vernacular reading could also be pronounced and read as "bâ" or "môa" but the second character, 逸, has the literary reading of "i̍t", while a vernacular reading of "ia̍k" (Quanzhou) or "e̍k" (Amoy & Zhangzhou) or "ia̍t" (Amoy).

== Location ==
=== Description ===
In 1225, the Zhu Fan Zhi noted that "the country of Ma-i is to the north of Borneo" and added that few pirates reach these shores. It also noted that "the people of Ma-i live in large villages (literally "settlements of more than a thousand households") on the opposite banks of a stream".

In the 1349 document Daoyi Zhilüe, it is noted that the settlement of Ma-i consisted of houses arranged on the two banks of a stream. It also noted that "its mountain range is flat and broad", "the fields are fertile," and "the climate is rather hot".

== Documentary sources ==
The Chinese and Bruneian records both describe trade relations with Ma-i.

Ma-i is first mentioned in Volume 186 of the official history of the Song dynasty, which lists Ma-i among the southern sea nations with whom Chinese merchants traded in the year 971 AD (the fourth year of Kai Bao of Song). The document describes the government's efforts to regulate and tax this "luxurious" trade. Historian William Henry Scott describes this entry as "the first positive reference to political states in or near the Philippines."

Ma-i is also speculated to be the older kingdom of Mayd, documented by 9th century Arab geographer and historian Al-Ya'qubi to be allied with kingdom of Muja (Brunei) against the China, which they waged war against.

In 1980, historian Robert Nicholl argued that the nation of "Maidh", referred to in the 10th-century records of the Sultanate of Brunei, refers to Ma-i, although Scott does not recognize this as a positive identification.

Later references to Ma-i, all describing trade, include:

- another mention (in Volume 489) in the History of Song,
- the 1225 AD Song dynasty document Zhu Fan Zhi (Chinese: 諸番志; lit. 'Account of the Various Barbarians'),
- the 1317 AD Yuan dynasty document Wenxian Tongkao (Chinese: 文獻通考; pinyin: Wénxiàn Tōngkǎo; Wade–Giles: Wenhsien T'ungk'ao; lit. 'Comprehensive Examination of Literature'), and
- the 1349 AD Yuan dynasty document Daoyi Zhilüe (simplified Chinese: 岛夷志略; traditional Chinese: 島夷誌略; pinyin: Dǎo Yí Zhì Lüè; lit. 'A Brief Account of Island Barbarians').

=== Historiography ===
The majority of these sources only mention Ma-i briefly, either affirming that Ma-i was one of the nations conducting trade in the "south seas" area or repeating hearsay about the supposed location of Ma-i. Scott notes that of the documents describing Ma-i, only the Zu Fan Zhi and the Daoyi Zhilüe provide substantial details. Filipino Chinese historian Bon Juan Go, in turn, notes that only the Wenxian Tongkao and Volumes 186 and 489 of the History of Song provide definitive dates.

Because all of these are Chinese imperial documents, historiographers have to consider the Sinocentric nature of the sources whenever conducting their analysis.

As noted by Zandro Vasquez Villanueva in 2009:

These tenth to fifteenth century tributary records provide significant information on the Chinese perceptions of how Philippine local polities were governed, the political landscape of the time, and the trade goods offered and desired by Philippine polities. Chinese travellers' accounts from the early second millennium AD are considered rich sources of information on the political economy of the early polities. However, they are heavily biased because of the traditional worldview of the Chinese Empire as the center of the universe, where all non-Chinese people are considered to be "barbarians" (Junker 1998). The context of these Chinese sources about the nature of Philippine polities must be analyzed carefully.

== Economic activities and trade practices ==
Since all the documents describing Ma-i were primarily concerned with trade, its economic activities and trade practices are the most documented aspects of Ma-i culture.

=== Exported products ===
Both the Song dynasty records (specifically the Zhu Fan Zhi) and Yuan dynasty records (specifically the Daoyi Zhilüe) describe the local products as "kapok cotton, yellow bees-wax, tortoise shell, medicinal betel nuts and cloth of various patterns." The 1225 Zhu Fan Zhi lists "yuta cloth" while the 1349 Daoyi Zhilüe lists "cloth of various patterns."

=== Barter items accepted as exchange ===
The Zhu Fan Zhi notes that in exchange, the locals accepted products such as "porcelain, trade gold, iron pots, lead, colored glass beads, and iron needles." The Daoyi Zhilüe later lists "caldrons, pieces of iron, red cloth or taffetas of various color stripes, ivory, and 'tint or the like'" as accepted items of exchange.

=== Administration of trade ===
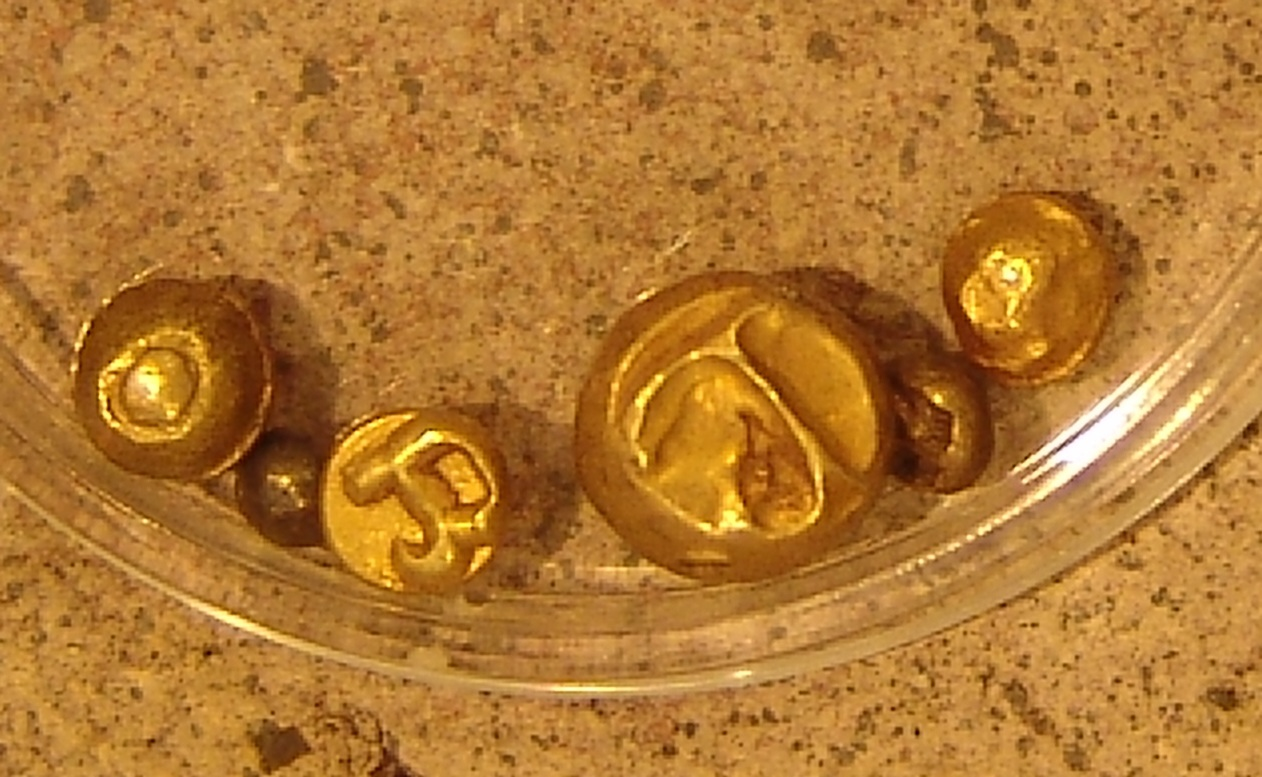
An assemblage of gold piloncitos—conical pre-colonial currency—bearing the Baybayin character for "Ma" suggests a potential numismatic link to the ancient polity of Ma-i, with the inscription potentially serving as an abbreviated signifier of the state's nomenclature.

The Zhu Fan Zhi notes that Ma-I's official plaza is its official venue for barter and trade and that officials have to be presented with white parasols as gifts:

"When trading ships enter the harbor, they stop in front of the official plaza, for the official plaza is that country's place for barter and trade and once the ship is registered, they mix freely. Since the local officials make a habit of using white umbrellas, the merchants must present them as gifts."

The Zhu Fan Zhi further describes the process of the transactions as follows:

The method of transacting business is for the savage traders to come all in a crowd and immediately transfer the merchandise into baskets and go off with it. If at first they can't tell who they are, gradually they come to know those who remove the goods so in the end nothing is actually lost. The savage traders then take the goods around to the other islands for barter and generally don't start coming back until September or October to repay the ship's merchants with what they have got. Indeed, there are some who don't come back even then, so ships trading with Mai are the last to reach home.

Similarly, the Daoyi Zhilüe says that:

"After agreeing on prices, the barbarian traders carry off the goods for bartering the native products and bring these products back to the Chinese in the amount agreed on. The Chinese vessels' traders (Filipinos) are trustworthy. They never fail to keep the agreement of their bargains."

=== Possible use of trade gold ===
The discovery of small gold ingots (referred to by modern numismatists as Piloncitos), presumed to have been used as currency and "stamped with what looks like the pre-Spanish Baybayin character 'ma'", has led some historians such as Ambeth Ocampo to theorize that the writing may be a reference to Ma-i, although numerous other interpretations have also been suggested.

== Culture ==
=== Religion ===
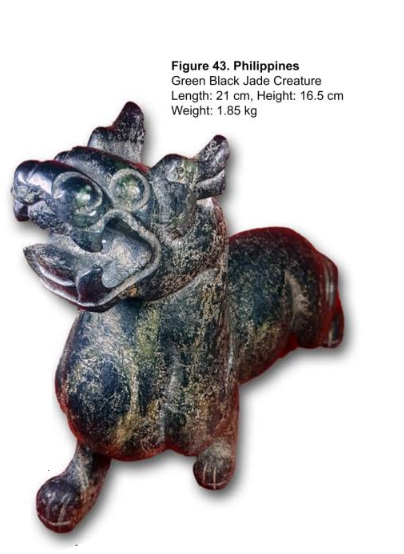
Green-Black Jade Protective Chimera Creature found in the Philippines around the proposed vicinity of Ma-i.

While documents did not definitively describe the religious beliefs of the people of Ma-i, the Zhu Fan Zhi did note the presence of unspecified religious artifacts in Ma-i, supposedly as of 1225 AD:

"There are metal images (Note: [lit. "Buddhas"], annotation by Scott 1989) of unknown origin scattered about in the tangled wilds."

Contemporary historiographers do not draw conclusions about the religion of Ma-i's residents based on this text. In his book Prehispanic Source Materials for the Study of Philippine History, Scott notes that a literal translation of the Zhu Fan Zhi text describes "metal buddhas." However, he and Chinese Scholar I-hsiung Ju translated this in 1968 as "metal images" to correct for the linguistic bias of the text.

In his seminal 1984 book Prehispanic Source Materials for the Study of Philippine History, Scott particularly questioned whether the presence of these images reflected actual beliefs by the people of Ma-i:

"The people in Ma-I sound like newcomers [to this port] since they don't know where those metal statues in the jungle come from."

Earlier writers, including José Rizal and Ferdinand Blumentritt, accepted the "buddhist connection" more readily. For example, in supporting Blumentritt's proposition that Ma-i was somewhere on Luzon Island, Rizal cites the use of the word "Buddhas" by the Zhu Fan Zhi as evidence:

"The gentleness of Tagalog customs that the first Spaniards found, very different from those of other provinces of the same race and in Luzon itself, can very well be the effect of Buddhism." (There are copper Buddha's images)."

Precluded from finding any Buddhist artifacts in Ma-i, Henry Otley Beyer, an American archaeologist, was able to excavate from Palawan (an island southwest of Mindoro that is presumably Ma-i) a clay medallion of a Buddhist Bodhisattva. The presence of this Buddhist religious item, along with the incorporation of Tantric philosophical and religious ideals in Tagalog vocabulary, may be proofs that indeed Ma-i was practicing Buddhism before the advent of Islam.

=== Food ===
The Chinese records made no specific note of the solid food the people of Ma-i ate, but the Daoyi Zhilüe did describe their process for making alcoholic beverages:

"The people boil seawater to make salt and ferment treacle (molasses) to make liquor."

=== Clothing ===
The Zhu Fan Zhi describes the people of Ma-i as covering themselves "with a cloth like a sheet or hide their bodies with a loin cloth." And the Daoyi Zhilüe, written a century later, describes the clothing and coiffure of the people of Ma-i, saying "In their customs they esteem the quality of chastity and uprightness. Both men and women do up their hair in a mallet-like tress. They wear a blue cotton shirt."

=== Funerary practices ===
In 1349, the Daoyi Zhilüe also made observations of funerary practices, describing them thus:

When any woman is burying her husband, she shaves her hair and fasts for seven days, lying beside her dead husband. Most of them nearly die. If after seven days they are not dead, their relatives urge them to eat. Should they get quite well they cherish their chastity by not marrying again during their whole lives. There are some even, who, when the body of their dead husband is burning, get into the funeral pyre and die. At the burial of a great chief, two or three thousand (sic. could be twenty or thirty) male or female slaves are put to death for burying with him.

== Diplomatic relations ==
=== Relationship with China and Brunei ===
Scott 1989 notes that Ma-i's relationship with Song and Yuan Dynasty was defined by trade, not by diplomacy:

Ma-i never sent a tribute mission to China and probably never needed to: it flourished during the Sung Dynasty when the imperial government was encouraging Chinese merchants to carry their goods abroad in their own ships."

The nature of Ma-i's relationship with Brunei is less clear because of scant documentation, but there is no indication of any relationship other than possible trade. However, in the 1300s the Chinese annals, Nanhai zhi, reported that Brunei had invaded or administered the Philippine kingdoms of Butuan, Sulu and Ma-i as well, which would regain their independence at a later date.

== Possible sites ==
Early theories for the location of Ma-i include locations in Central Luzon or the Southern Tagalog regions. An early theory put forward in 1914 by Austin Craig and asserted by local historians, suggested Malolos in Bulacan as a potential site for Ma-i.

For many years, scholars believed that Ma-i was likely to have been on the island of Mindoro within the municipality of Bulalacao, as there is an old settlement there named Mait. However, this has been questioned on the basis of physical evidence and an analysis of Chinese orthography. Recent scholarship casts doubt on this theory, arguing that historical descriptions better match Bay, Laguna (whose name is pronounced either Ba-e[h] or Ba-i), which once occupied a large territory on the eastern coasts of Laguna de Bay.

Both sites have names that sound similar to Ma-i. The pre-colonial name of Mindoro was "Ma-it", whereas historical variants of the name of Bay, Laguna include "Bae", "Bai", and "Vahi".

=== Mindoro as Ma-i ===
Mindoro being equated to Ma-i or Mait was first mentioned in Spanish records, when Chapter 36 of Juan Francisco de San Antonio's Chronicas de N.S.P. Francisco en las Islas Filipinas, China y Japón 1738 is called De la Provincia y Isla de Mait o Mindoro ("The Province of the Island of Mait or Mindoro"), showing that the term Mait and Mindoro were once interchangeable.

From the late 19th century to the early 20th century, scholars such as Ferdinand Blumentritt and Dr. Fletcher Gardener found out that the Hampangan, otherwise known as the Hanunoo of southern Mindoro, called the island as Mait or Mayit. This was corroborated by another research by Fay Cooper Cole for the Field Museum of Natural History in Chicago in 1912, when he too discovered that Mindoro was once called Mait.

To add further, while the Hanunoo Mangyans were considered by the Spaniards and other European writers as "half savages" with low levels of culture, Hanunoo were revealed to have had a script of their own. Blumentritt himself, who commented on Dr. Adolf Bernhard Meyer and Dr. A. Schadenberg's work, expressed:

"From the materials given . . . . we can only see that the Mangyans are on a very low level of culture and civilization. One was therefore very little prepared to discover a script in such a people."

Historian William Henry Scott in 1984 wrote that "there [was] no reason to doubt that Ma-i or "Ma-yit" is Mindoro, for Mait was the old name of the island when the Spaniards arrived, and that name is still known to its hill tribes and fishermen", referring mainly to fishermen from Aklan. Scott places the location of Ma-i specifically around the Mauhaw River in Bulalacao.

While contested in contemporary scholarship by historians such as Go Bon Juan and Zeus Salazar, textbooks containing this assumption are still widely in use.

==== Bay, Laguna, as Ma-i ====
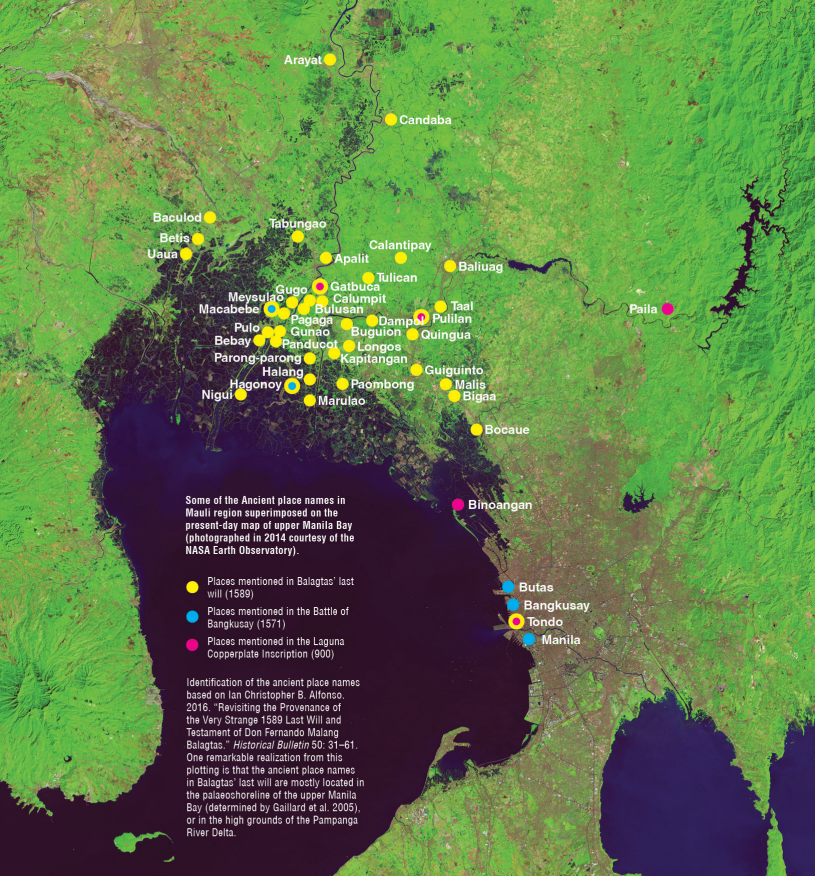
Proposed location and place-names of the kingdom of Ma-i as per the National Historical Commission of the Philippines citing the Will of Balagtas.

The idea that Ma-i was located somewhere in the Tagalog region was proposed early on by scholars such as Blumentritt and José Rizal. Eventually, though, it became popular during the middle and late 20th century to believe that it had become Mait, a place now located in Mindoro.

In 2004, Chinese Filipino scholar Go Bon Juan questioned this common belief, citing the lack of physical evidence for a large, prosperous settlement on the island of Mindoro. He suggested that Chinese orthography equally allows for the possibility that Ma-i became Bay, Laguna, whose name is pronounced "bah-EH" (IPA: /bɐʔˈɛ/) by locals. He notes that Bay is also a match for the physical characteristics of Ma-i, and that numerous artifacts found in the area (including the nearby towns of Victoria, Pila and Lumban, Laguna) suggest the presence of a prosperous pre-colonial settlement. Grace P. Odal-Devora notes that this region was the place of the taga-ilaya, whereas the taga-laud who settled downstream on the banks of the Pasig River.

Go suggests that Ma-i, as Ba-e, became less important as the riverine settlements of Namayan, Tondo, and Maynila rose to power, but also noted that it still nonetheless served as the capital for the province of Laguna de Bay, which would later be split into the provinces of Laguna and Morong (modern Rizal Province, which included coastal towns now part of the National Capital Region).

The accounts provided regarding the indigenous commodities of Ma-i—specifically cotton, beeswax, tortoise shells, betel nuts, and polychromatic textiles—exhibit significant congruence with later colonial documentation. Notably, these descriptions align with Miguel de Loarca's 1582 report, which characterized the Manila Bay littoral as a fertile region distinguished by its prolific production of rice and cotton. Toponymic evidence further reinforces this historical continuity. The name Bulacan is etymologically derived from the term for cotton (bulak), a connection mirrored in the historical nomenclature of San Ildefonso (formerly Bulac) and various localities in Bocaue. Similarly, the production of beeswax is reflected in the name of San Miguel de Mayumo, while the recorded trade in betel nuts corresponds to the deeply ingrained cultural practice of betel chewing among the pre-colonial populations of the upper Pampanga River Basin. Furthermore, the mention of sophisticated textiles serves as an index of a well-established, pre-colonial handweaving industry in the provinces of Bulacan and Pampanga. The inclusion of tortoise shells in Wang's catalog also points toward the ecological significance of the Bataan coastline—a known habitat for sea turtles (pawikan), later evidenced by the Hispanic toponym Tortugas in Balanga. Collectively, these references suggest that the extraction and trade of such marine and terrestrial resources were already systematic and widespread prior to European contact.

Wang's observation that the inhabitants of Ma-i donned "blue cotton shirts" aligns with documented historical vestimentary traditions in the region, particularly among the Kapampangan people, who maintained a preference for all-indigo attire into the 19th century. This early description provides a plausible historical basis for the prevalence of indigo-related toponyms across the Manila Bay littoral, many of which derive from indigenous terms for the indigo plant (Indigofera suffruticosa), such as tayum and nila. Linguistic and geographical evidence further substantiates the antiquity of these dyeing practices. Examples include Patayum (the former name of Barangay San Bartolome in Pampanga), which denotes a site dedicated to indigo dyeing, and Tayuman in Manila, signifying a location for indigo cultivation. Furthermore, the etymology of Maynila (Manila) exemplifies this naming convention; the prefix May- ("to have" or "there is") combined with the root nila ("indigo") suggests that the settlement was historically characterized by the abundance or processing of this natural dye.

The possible readings of Chinese: 麻逸 in Hokkien and Mandarin:

- Hokkien Chinese: 麻逸; Pe̍h-ōe-jī: mâ-i̍t (literary) / bâ-ia̍k (Quanzhou vernacular) / bâ-e̍k (Amoy & Zhangzhou vernacular) / bâ-ia̍t (Amoy vernacular) / môa-ia̍k (Quanzhou vernacular) / môa-e̍k (Amoy & Zhangzhou vernacular) / môa-ia̍t (Amoy vernacular)
- Mandarin Chinese: 麻逸; pinyin: máyì; Wade–Giles: ma^{²}-i^{⁴}

=== Relationship with nearby territories ===
The Zhu Fan Zhi mentions a number of territories in its account of Ma-i, saying:

"San-hsu, Pai-p'u-yen, P'u-li-lu, Li-yin-tung, Liu-hsin, Li-han, etc., are all the same sort of place as Ma-i"

Contemporary scholars believe that these are the Baipuyan (Babuyan Islands), Bajinong (Busuanga), Liyin (Lingayen) and Lihan (present day Malolos City). Malolos is a coastal town and one of the ancient settlement around Manila Bay near Tondo.

While the phrase "subordinates" has sometimes been interpreted to mean that these places are territories of Ma-I, Scott clarifies that:

"The text says, not that these places belong to Ma-i, but they are of Ma-i's 'shu', a word that means type or class as a noun, and subordinate (e.g. shu kuo, tributary state"), as an adjective, being used elsewhere in the Chu Fan Chih in these two senses"

=== All previous locations are correct ===
A research paper by Jolan S. Saluria of the Polytechnic University of the Philippines postulates that all previously mentioned places were indeed part of Ma-i and that the confusion over which was the official location of Ma-i was just a product of the changing territorial scope of Ma-i as time progressed. With the original capital being located in the Southern Luzon and Laguna de Ba-i area aligning with Bon Go's statements; then having expanded to other places like the vassals and colonies located in other islands as mentioned in the Zhu Fan Zhi, before the of rise of the Kingdom of Luzon via the invasion of the Brunei Sultanate, made Manila the new center of power in the region, in which case, Ma-i lost its diplomatic recognition in the Chinese court which now logged the Luzon Kingdom as the one operating in the place which was formerly Mai's and then Ma-i lost its former physical capital in Southern Luzon and Laguna de Bay through Manila's rise and invasion and then Ma-i, upon the dissolution of its capital, fled to and survived merely as a remnant-state in the island of Mindoro. Furthermore, the data hypothesized that Ma-i was a federation composed of many island kingdoms rather than just one state. Making the actual center of traffic and commerce in this federation, not the land-based areas mentioned in the text but the bodies of water therein, mainly the rivers, lake, and seas, of Southern Luzon, Laguna de Bay, the Verde Island Passage, as well as the islands surrounding them.

== Ma-i after the Yuan dynasty records ==
No mentions of the country of Ma-i have been found after 1349 (or 1339 depending on the source). However, historians generally believe that Ma-i continued to exist under a different name.

=== Later events on the island of Mindoro ===
If, even though it had disappeared from historical writings, Ma-i really was located in Mindoro and it continued to exist until 1500, some believe by it would have been affected by the raids conducted by the Sultanate of Brunei around the year 1498–99, which included a series of raids against Taytay in Palawan and the island of Mindoro.

=== Spanish conquest ===
If Ma-i continued to exist until the 1570s, then it must have been affected by the arrival of the Spanish conquerors. As described in an anonymous account translated in Blair and Robertson's The Philippine Islands, 1493–1898, Miguel López de Legazpi sent Captain Martín de Goiti and Juan de Salcedo on an expedition to Mindoro in May 1570, to counteract Muslim pirates based on the island who were attacking their new headquarters on nearby Panay Island. Legazpi himself would arrive on Mindoro the next year, 1571. The Spanish conquered and burned two square forts on Lubang Island, each with earthen embankments 2 meters high and a surrounding moat two and a half fathoms wide. Each fort, moreover, had 10 to 12 lantakas, not counting several smaller guns. After destroying these Muslim forts, they despoiled the town of Mamburao while they were at Mindoro. There was even stone walls in one of the hills defending Mindoro.

Whatever happened to Ma-i between the last time it was mentioned by documents at the end of the Yuan Dynasty in the 14th century and the beginning of Spanish conquest in the 1570s, both Mindoro and Bay were eventually absorbed into the Philippine Islands under the Spanish Empire.

== Presumed rulers of Ma-i ==
Name	Title held	Date	Notes
Unnamed ruler	described in the Zhu Fan Zhi as "王" Wang (King)	ca. 1225	implied by the text's description as a "country", which in the Chinese worldview of the time should be ruled by a king
Unnamed ruler	implied by the description in the Daoyi Zhilüe)	ca. 1339	presumably a different ruler from the one described in the Zhu Fan Zhi

== Associated Filipino family names ==
- Gatmaitan – Ferdinand Blumentritt believed that Ma-i may have been the origin of the Filipino Family name Gatmaitan, which can be broken down into "Gat", meaning leader or lord; the word Mait; and the suffix "-an", which indicates a place name. The ancestor which gave the Gatmaitan family its name was lord of a place named "Mait" or "Maitan" Austin Craig advanced the hypothesis that Gat Maitan was a prominent pre-colonial nobleman whose domain encompassed the upper Manila Bay region. Etymological analysis suggests that while the prefix Gat denotes nobility, the term Maitan likely refers to a location characterized by abundance, as indicated by the suffix -an. However, the root mait remains linguistically elusive, as it is absent from historical Tagalog and Kapampangan vocabularios. Drawing from the genealogical records in Balagtas’ (Will of Balagtas) testament, Gat Maitan's jurisdiction included several ancient locales—specifically Malisquiapo, Guiguinto, Napulinan, Gatiagaan, and Lugam—which correspond to the modern municipalities of Malolos and Guiguinto in Bulacan. This noble lineage persisted into the Spanish colonial era as a surname, most notably within the ancestry of national heroes Marcelo H. and Gregorio H. del Pilar. Furthermore, the toponymic resonance between Mait and the ancient polity of Ma-i suggests a potential, though speculative, historical connection within the region's geopolitical landscape.
- Gatchalian – Misinterpretations of the word "Shi" in the Song dynasty records have led to the family name Gatchalian also being associated with Ma-i. The name can be broken down as "Gat Sa Li-han" (Lord at Li-han), and the records list Li-han as one of the palaces "of Ma-i's Shi." Scott debunks the perception that Li-han is a place ruled by Ma-i, and suggests instead that Li-han is a place "of the same kind" (but of lesser rank) as Ma-i. Also, instead of equating Li-han with Malolos, Scott suggested that Li-han may be Lumban, Laguna.

== See also ==
- History of the Philippines (900-1521)
- Prehistory of Laguna (province)
- Mindoro (province)
- History of Song
- Zhu Fan Zhi
- Wenxian Tongkao
- Daoyi Zhilüe
- William Henry Scott (historian)
- Maginoo
- Principalia

== Sources ==
- Blair, Emma Helen & Robertson, James Alexander, eds. (1903). 1569–1576. Vol. 3. Historical introduction and additional notes by Edward Gaylord Bourne. Cleveland, Ohio: Arthur H. Clark Company. "Explorations by early navigators, descriptions of the islands and their peoples, their history and records of the catholic missions, as related in contemporaneous books and manuscripts, showing the political, economic, commercial and religious conditions of those islands from their earliest relations with European nations to the beginning of the nineteenth century."
- Cole, Fay-Cooper (1912). Chinese Pottery in the Philippines.
- Craig, Austin (1914). A Thousand Years Of Philippine History Before The Coming Of The Spaniards. Manila.
- Go, Bon Juan (2005). "Ma'I in Chinese Records – Mindoro or Bai? An Examination of a Historical Puzzle". Philippine Studies. 53 (1). Ateneo de Manila UP: 119–138. Archived from the original on October 21, 2013.
- Jocano, F. Landa (1973). Folk Medicine in a Philippine Community. Quezon City: Punlad Research House, Inc. ISBN 9716220154.
- Jocano, F. Landa (1998). Filipino Prehistory: Rediscovering Precolonial Heritage (2001 ed.). Quezon City: Punlad Research House, Inc. ISBN 971-622-006-5.
- Junker, Laura Lee (1998). "Integrating History and Archaeology in the Study of Contact Period Philippine Chiefdoms". Int. J. Hist. Archaeol. 2 (4): 291–320. doi:10.1023/A:1022611908759. JSTOR 20852912. S2CID 141415414.
- de Mas y Sans, Sinibaldo (1843). Informe sobre el estado de las islas Filipinas en 1842 (in Spanish). Vol. Tomo I. Madrid.
- Nicholl, Robert (1980). Brunei Rediscovered: A Survey of Early Times. Eighth Conference of the International Association of Historians of Asia. Vol. 4. Kuala Lumpur: Brunei Museum Journal. pp. 52–74.
  Nicholl, Robert (1983). "Brunei Rediscovered: A Survey of Early Times". Journal of Southeast Asian Studies. 14 (1). J. Southeast Asian Stud.: 32–45. doi:10.1017/S0022463400008973. JSTOR 20174317. S2CID 161541098.
- Odal-Devora, Grace P. (2000). "The River Dwellers". In Alejandro, Reynaldo Gamboa (ed.). Pasig: River of Life. Water Series Trilogy. Unilever Philippines. ISBN 978-9719227205.
- Patanñe, E. P. (1996). The Philippines in the 6th to 16th Centuries. San Juan, Metro Manila: LSA. ISBN 978-9719166603.
- Philippine Daily Inquirer, Ambeth R. Ocampo (October 26, 2016). "A relationship of 1,000 years". Archived from the original on October 27, 2016.
- Rees, Colin (2016). The Philippines: A Natural History. Quezon City: Ateneo De Manila University Press. ISBN 978-971-550-753-0.
- Scott, William Henry (1989). "Societies in Prehispanic Philippines". Prehispanic Source Materials for the Study of Philippine History. Quezon City: New Day Publishers. ISBN 978-9711002268.
- Scott, William Henry (1997). Barangay: Sixteenth Century Philippine Culture and Society. Quezon City: Ateneo de Manila UP. ISBN 978-9715501354.
- Villanueva, Zandro Vasquez (2009). Cultural Encounters and Transformation of Early Historical Polities on Lubang Island, the Philippines, ca. AD 1200-1800 (PhD thesis). U Arizona. hdl:10150/195058.
- Wang, Zhenping (2008). "Reading Song-Ming Records on the Pre-colonial History of the Philippines". Journal of East Asian Cultural Interaction Studies. 1. Kansai U: 249–260. ISSN 1882-7748.
- Wolters, Oliver W. (1999). History, Culture, and Region in Southeast Asian Perspectives. Ithaca: Southeast Asia Program. ISBN 978-0877277255.
