= Antonio de Morga =

Spanish soldier, historian and lawyer (1559–1636)

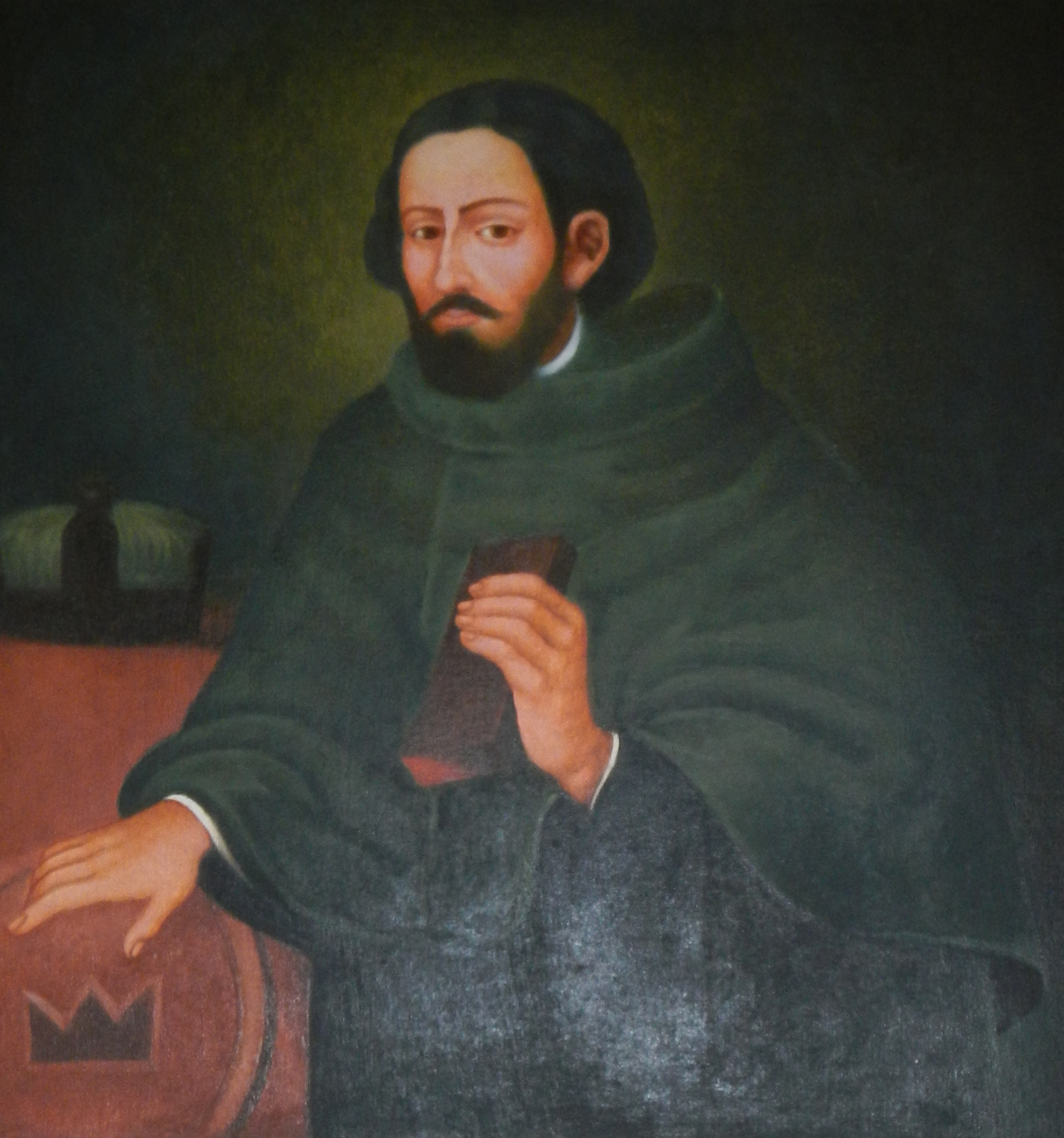
- Born: Antonio de Morga Sánchez Garay; 29 November 1559; Seville, Crown of Castile
- Died: 21 July 1636 (aged 76); Quito, Viceroyalty of Peru
- Citizenship: Spanish
- Education: University of Osuna; University of Salamanca
- Occupations: Colonial official, lawyer and writer
- Writing career
- Language: Spanish

Antonio de Morga Sánchez Garay (29 November 1559 – 21 July 1636) was a Spanish soldier, lawyer and a high-ranking colonial official for 43 years, in the Philippines (1594 to 1604), New Spain and Peru, where he was president of the Real Audiencia for 20 years.

He was also a historian. After being reassigned to Mexico, he published the book Sucesos de las islas Filipinas in 1609, considered one of the most important works on the early history of the Spanish colonization of the Philippines. As deputy governor in the Philippines, he restored the audencia. He took over the function of judge or oidor. He also took command of Spanish ships in a 1600 naval battle against Dutch corsairs, but suffered defeat and barely survived.

His history was first published in English in 1868; numerous editions have been published in English, including a 1907 edition. (Note: available online at the Gutenberg Project:) It has also been reprinted in Spanish and other languages.

== Education and service in the Philippines ==
Antonio de Morga Sánchez Garay was born in Seville. He graduated from the University of Salamanca in 1574 and in 1578 received a doctorate in canon law. He taught briefly in Osuna, and then returned to Salamanca to study civil law. In 1580 he joined the government service as a lawyer. Among other positions in Spain, he held that of auditor general of the galleys. In 1582 he was serving as mayor of Baracaldo in Vizcaya when he first married, to Juana de Briviesca de Munotones.

In August 1593 he was notified that he had been selected as lieutenant to the governor-general of the Philippines, starting what would become 43 years of colonial service. He traveled accompanied by his family, 14 servants, three black slaves and his collection of books. Following the route of that time, he sailed from Cádiz in February 1594, arriving in Mexico in May. During the following period of preparation for the Pacific voyage, he heard two important cases, and supervised the supplying of the two ships to be used. He also recruited 200 soldiers for the garrison in Manila. They departed Acapulco on March 22, 1595, reaching Manila on June 11, 1595. He had the second-most powerful position in the colony.

He first served under Governor-General Luis Pérez Dasmariñas, who was interim after his father's death. Francisco Tello de Guzmán soon succeeded him, and Morga reported to him during most of his time in the colony. In his account of the colonial Philippines published in 1609, Morga noted the miserable condition suffered by many of the Spanish/Mexican soldiers, who were young, ill-paid and suffered in that unfamiliar environment. Few wanted to settle in Manila, and higher-level government officials also sought to leave the colony in a few years. His first two reports to the Crown covered a wide variety of topics, mentioning Japan, Mindanao, and China, in addition to civil, military and ecclesiastical activities within the colony.

He issued regulations for administrative reform, known as the Ordenzas. Among his reforms was to restore the audencia. In 1598 he resigned as lieutenant governor to assume the office of oidor, or judge, in the newly re-established Audiencia of Manila. The position required his removal from much public life.

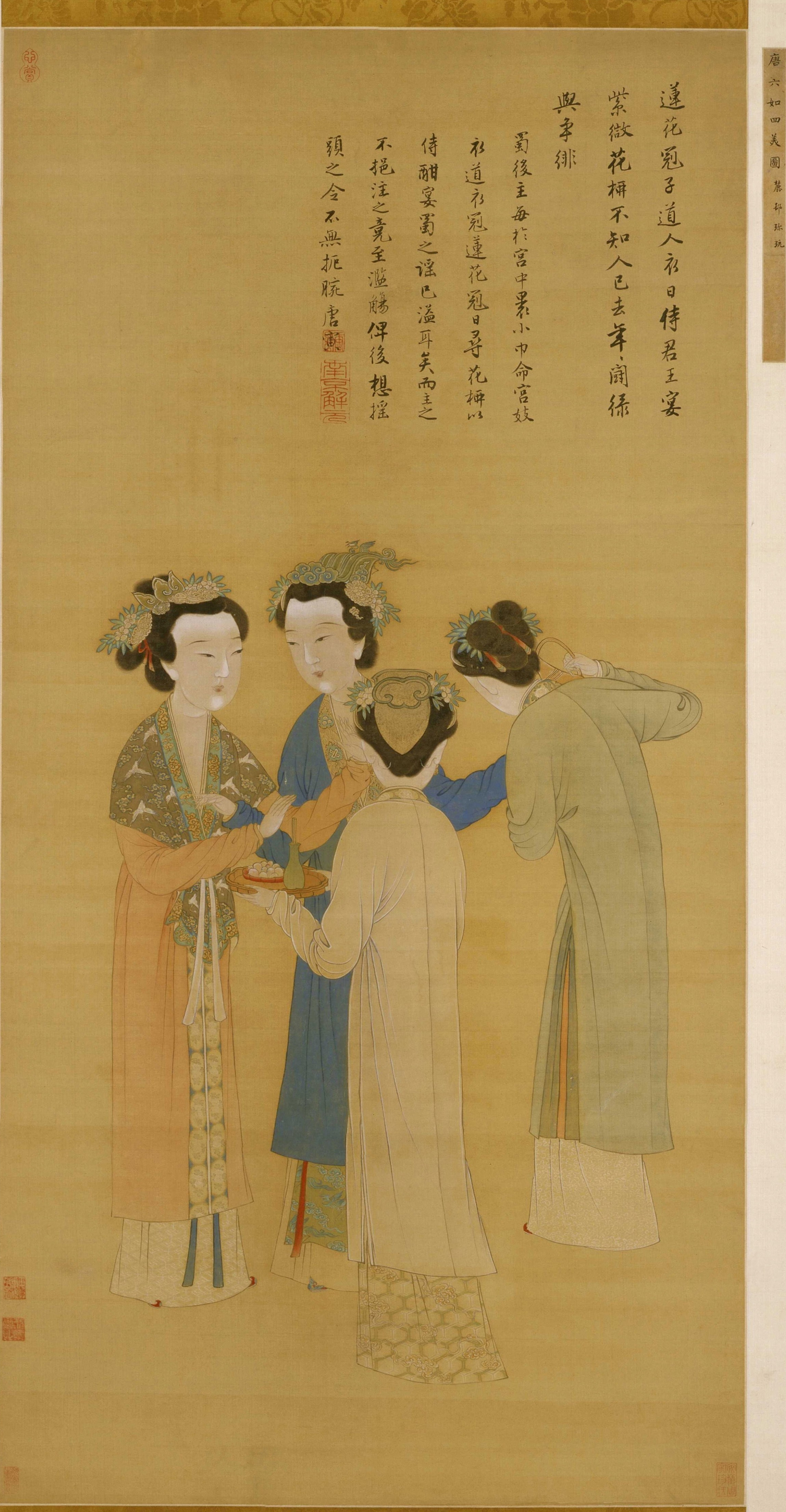
Court Ladies of Former Shu, by Tang Yin (1470–1523); late Ming dynasty silk cloths like the ones worn by ladies in this painting were imported in bulk to the Spanish territories through Manila, mentioned by de Morga.

During this period, Morga encouraged the growth in trade between Spain and China, known as the galleon trade. Chinese ships came to Manila to trade. From there, the Spanish sent galleons to Acapulco, where goods were shipped to Mexico City and then to Veracruz, for transportation to Spain. They were paid for with Spanish/Mexican silver, which became a currency in China.

While stationed in Manila, Morga noted many of the wares imported from the Ming dynasty of China. He mentioned porcelain only once, although at this time it was becoming one of the greatest export items, along with silk, to Europe from China. From his observation of textiles in the Manila inventory, the Spanish were buying:

...raw silk in bundles...fine untwisted silk, white and of all colors...quantities of velvets, some plain and some embroidered in all sorts of figures, colors, and fashions, with body of gold and embroidered with gold; woven stuff and brocades, of gold and silver upon silk of various colors and patterns...damasks, satins, taffetas...

Other goods that de Morga mentioned as being exported in the galleon trade were:

...musk, benzoin and ivory; many bed ornaments, hangings, coverlets and tapestries of embroidered velvet...tablecloths, cushions, and carpets; horse-trappings of the same stuffs, and embroidered with glass beads and seed-pearls; also pearls and rubies, sapphires and crystals; metal basins, copper kettles and other copper and cast-iron pots. . .wheat flour, preserves made of orange, peach, pair, nutmeg and ginger, and other fruits of China; salt pork and other salt meats; live fowl of good breed and many fine capons...chestnuts, walnuts...little boxes and writing cases; beds, tables, chairs, and gilded benches, painted in many figures and patterns. They bring domestic buffaloes; geese that resemble swans; horses, some mules and asses; even caged birds, some of which talk, while others sing, and they make them play innumerable tricks...pepper and other spices.

De Morga closed his inventory list by stating that there were "rarities which, did I refer to them all, I would never finish, nor have sufficient paper for it."

== Combat with Dutch corsairs ==
In 1600 Dutch corsairs under Olivier van Noort were preying on shipping entering Manila harbor. According to Morga's account, Governor Francisco de Tello de Guzmán and the Audiencia appointed Morga to go to Cavite and assemble, equip, and supply a fleet to attack the Dutch (31 October 1600). The ships available were the San Diego, the San Bartolomé, and some smaller vessels. Some refitting was necessary, since both the San Diego and the San Bartolomé were cargo ships. According to Morga, this was done without drawing on the colonial treasury (i.e., at his own expense, perhaps with other private contributions).

Morga had had some military experience, having been general of a Spanish fleet some time previously and lieutenant of the captain general of the Philippines for some years, but he had never seen combat.

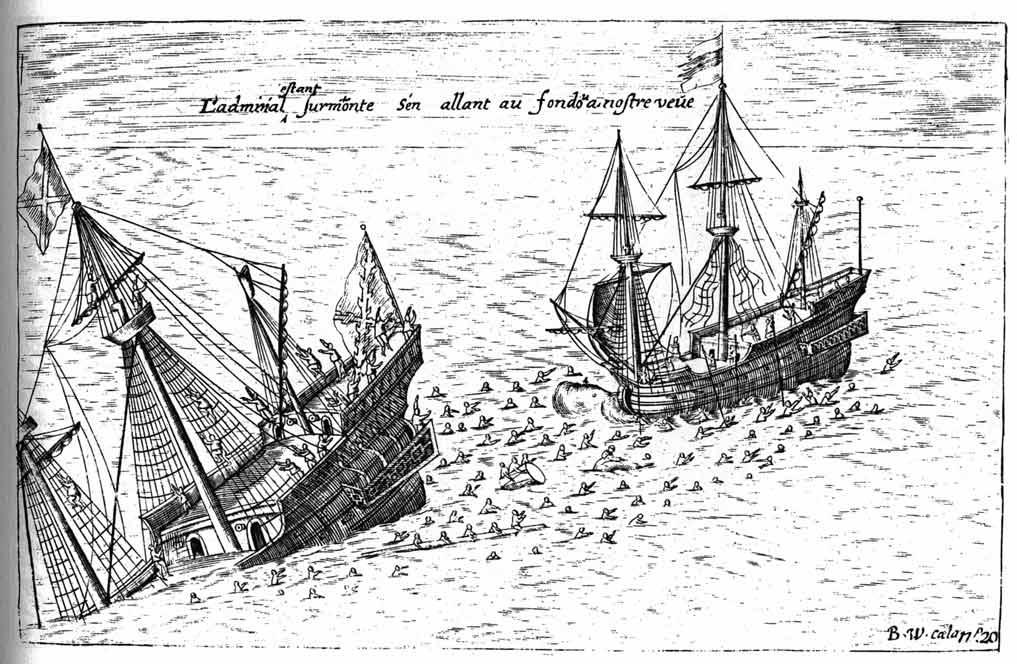
Illustration of 1603 representing the combat of the San Diego of Morga against the Mauritius of Van Noort

On 1 December 1600, Governor Tello appointed Morga captain general of the fleet, with orders to attack the two Dutch ships. The two forces met on 14 December 1600. The Spanish also had two ships, and one sailed off in pursuit of one of the Dutch ships. Unable to fire – the gunports were closed because they were under the waterline, because he had allowed the ship to be dangerously overloaded – Morga ordered the San Diego to ram the Mauritius and grapple it. Thirty soldiers and some sailors boarded the Mauritius, taking possession of the forecastle and after-cabin and capturing the Dutch standard. The main and mizzen masts were stripped of sails and rigging. The Dutch retreated to the bow, where at first it seemed they were about to surrender. However, they soon renewed the fight with muskets and artillery.

An intense, six-hour hand-to-hand battle ensued, and many were killed on each side. The Dutch were said to have very few men left, and then the Mauritius caught fire. Fearing the fire, the San Diego recalled its men and cast off. However, the Spanish ship was taking on water and sinking, either from the ramming or from the artillery of the Mauritius. (Accounts differ.)

The Dutch took this opportunity to extinguish the fire and set sail with the foresail, the only sail remaining, and with a skeleton crew. They eventually reached Borneo. The other Dutch ship, however, was captured by the San Bartolome. It was taken to Manila, where captain Biesmann and 25 surviving sailors were hanged.

The San Diego sank so quickly that the men for the most part were unable to disarm or abandon ship. Perhaps 350 men were lost. Morga swam for four hours, holding on to the Dutch standard, and made it to a small deserted island, where a few others of the ship's company also arrived.

This is based on the account of Morga, as published in his 1609 Sucesos de las Islas Filipinas. He blamed the captain of the San Bartolome for the loss of the San Diego, because he had pursued the other Dutch ship rather than attacking the Mauritius. The Dutch account of these events was very different, accusing Morga of incompetence and cowardice.

In 1992, French explorers led by Franck Goddio excavated the sunken San Diego with its treasure. Because of the large number of artifacts found with it (over 34,000), this was hailed as a great archaeological discovery. The artifacts included Chinese porcelain, celadon ware, Japanese katanas, Spanish morions, Portuguese cannons, and Mexican coins. An MV San Diego warship museum has been constructed on Fortune Island to display and interpret many of the artifacts. This was the island reached by Morga and the other survivors of the San Diego.

== In New Spain and Peru ==
On 10 July 1603, Morga was reassigned to Mexico, in command of the ships sailing that year for New Spain. He became alcalde of criminal causes in the Royal Audiencia of Mexico City. He was also advisor to the viceroy on military matters and counsel for the Holy Office of the Inquisition. He served in Mexico until 1615, publishing his history of the Philippines in 1609, which has become noted for its account of the early colonial years and has been translated into numerous languages and published in many editions.

In 1615 he was named president of the Audiencia of Quito, within the Viceroyalty of Peru. He arrived in Guayaquil on 8 September 1615, having narrowly escaped falling into the hands of Dutch corsairs off the island of Santa Clara. He took up his office in Quito on 30 September 1615. During his administration, the textile industry advanced and the University of San Gregorio Magno was founded. It was a time of confrontation between the civil and ecclesiastic powers, as well as disputes between the Creole and Peninsular monks for control of the religious orders. Although Morga was widely known to gamble extensively, have affairs with women, and conduct other questionable activities, he still achieved bureaucratic reforms, as well as of the liturgy, and helped improve treatment of the native peoples.

In 1625 de Morga was investigated for corruption and arrested. On 18 September 1627, he was cleared of the charges and his offices were restored to him. He died in 1636. Except for the period 1625–27, he held the position of president of the Audiencia of Quito for 20 years, from 1615 until the year of his death. Most presidents of the Audencia served about five years. Even as he aged, Morga pursued women. Shortly before his death in 1636, he was relieved of his duties. He was fined 2000 gold ducats for "having lewd relationships with much publicity and with many women".

== History of the Philippine Islands ==
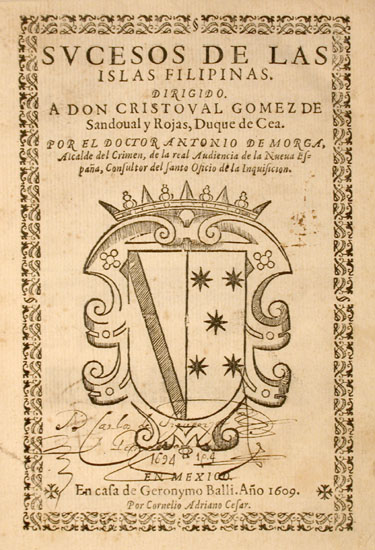
Title page of Sucesos de las Islas Filipinas.

Morga suffered important failures in both his military and political capacities. The same cannot be said for his work as historian. In 1609, he published the work for which he is now remembered – Sucesos de las Islas Filipinas (Events in the Philippine Isles). This work, perhaps the best account of Spanish colonialism in the Philippines written during that period, is based partly on documentary research, partly on keen observation, and partly on Morga's personal involvement and knowledge.

The history was published in two volumes, both in 1609 by Casa de Geronymo Balli, in Mexico City. (The work had circulated for years before this in manuscript form.) New Spain viceroy Luis de Velasco (hijo) authorized the publication and granted Morga the sole right to publish it for ten years, on 7 April 1609. On the same date, Fray García Guerra, archbishop of Mexico, approved the publication of the work. The history covers the years from 1493 to 1603. Political, social, and economic phases of life, both among the natives and their conquerors, are treated. Morga's official position allowed him access to many government documents.

The work greatly impressed Philippine independence hero José Rizal (1861–96), himself a man of letters and of action. He decided to annotate it and publish a new edition. He began work on this in London, completing it in Paris in 1890. He wrote:

If the book (Sucesos de las Islas Filipinas) succeeds to awaken your consciousness of our past, already effaced from your memory, and to rectify what has been falsified and slandered, then I have not worked in vain, and with this as a basis, however small it may be, we shall be able to study the future.

The first English translation was published in London in 1868. Another English translation by Blair and Robertson was published in Cleveland in 1907, (Note: available online at the Gutenberg Project) and an edition edited by J.S. Cummins was published by the Hakluyt Society in 1971 (ISBN 0-521-01035-7).

== Works ==
- Morga, Antonio de (1609). Sucesos de las Islas Filipinas. Mexico: Casa de Geronimo Balli.
- Morga, Antonio de (1868). The Philippine Islands, Moluccas, Siam, Cambodia, Japan, and China, at the Close of the Sixteenth Century. Translated by Stanley, Henry E.J. London: The Haykluyt Society.
- Morga, Antonio de (1890). Sucesos de las Islas Filipinas. Annotated by Rizal, José. Paris: Garnier Hermanos.
- Morga, Antonio de (1909). Sucesos de las Islas Filipinas. edition by Retana, W.E. (new ed.). Madrid: Victoriano Suárez.
