= Sucesos de las Islas Filipinas =

1609 book by Antonio de Morga

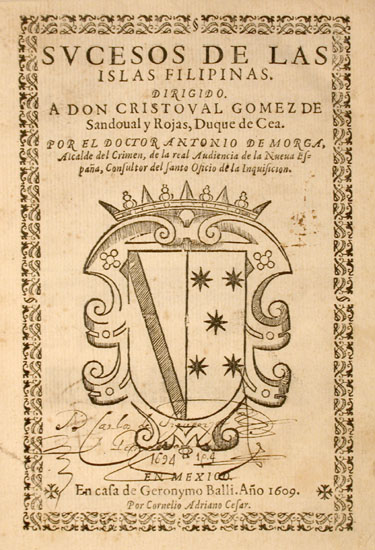
- Author: Antonio De Morga
- Original title: Sucesos de las Islas Filipinas
- Language: Spanish
- Genre: History
- Publisher: Casa de Geronymo Balli
- Publication date: April 7, 1609
- Publication place: Mexico
- English publication date: 1887
- Media type: Manuscript
- ISBN: 0-521-01035-7

Sucesos de las Islas Filipinas ('Events of the Philippine Islands') is a book written and published by Antonio de Morga considered one of the most important works on the early history of the Spanish colonization of the Philippines. It was published in 1609 after he was reassigned to Mexico in two volumes by Casa de Geronymo Balli, in Mexico City. The first English translation was published in London in 1868 and another English translation by Blair and Robertson was published in Cleveland in 1907.

The work greatly impressed but also garnered heavy criticism from Philippine national hero José Rizal who found it rife with erroneous claims and a eurocentric bias. Rizal decided to annotate it and publish a new edition and began working on it in London and completing it in Paris in 1890.

== History ==
Antonio de Morga's Sucesos de las Islas Filipinas has been recognized as a first-hand account of Spanish colonial venture in Asia during the 16th century. The book was first published in Mexico in 1609 and has been re-edited number of times. The Hakluyt Society, a text publication society, in 1851 catches its attention, and an edition was prepared by H. E. J. Stanley but was only published in 1868.

Sucesos de las Islas Filipinas is based on Antonio de Morga's personal experiences and other documentations from eye-witnesses of the events such as the survivors of Miguel López de Legazpi's Philippine expedition.

== Contents ==
The title literally means "Events of the Philippine Islands" and thus the book's primary goal is a documentation of events during the early years of the Spanish colonial period of the Philippines as observed by the author himself. It also includes Filipino customs, traditions, manners and religion at the time.
