= San Diego (ship) =

Coordinates: 14.0600°N 120.4940°E

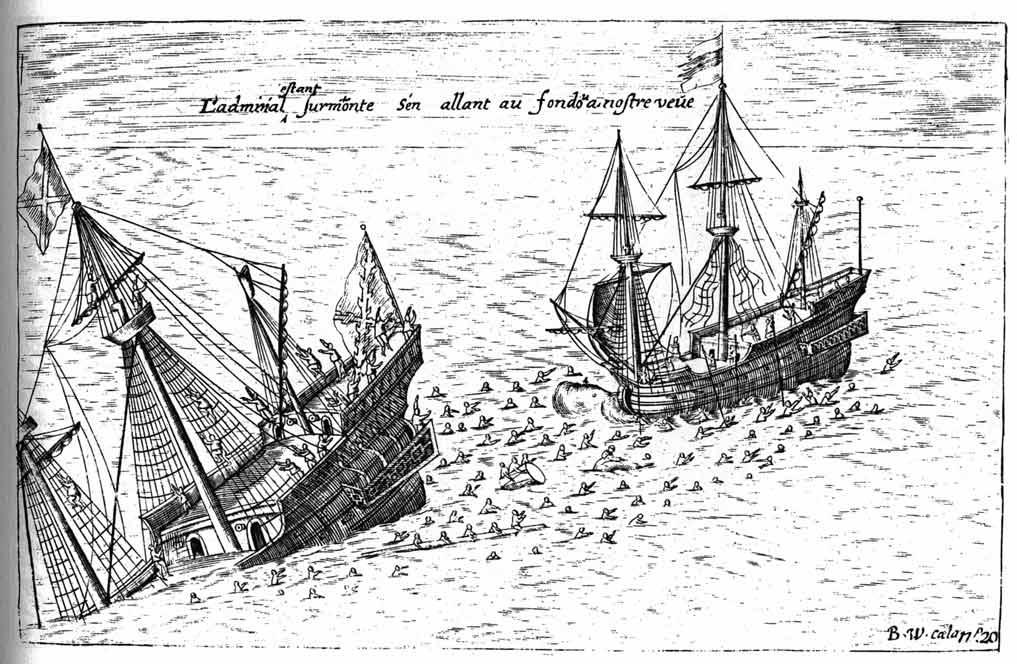
- San Diego sinking

History
- Fate: Sunk December 14, 1600

General characteristics
- Type: Galleon
- Tonnage: 300 tons
- Length: 115 ft (35 m)

The galleon San Diego was built as the trading ship San Antonio before hastily being converted into a warship of the Spanish Navy. On December 14, 1600, the fully laden San Diego was engaged by the Dutch warship Mauritius under the command of Admiral Olivier van Noort a short distance away from Fortune Island, Nasugbu, Philippines. Since San Diego could not handle the extra weight of her cannons, which led to a permanent list and put the cannon portholes below sea level, she was sunk without firing a single shot in response. The Dutch were later reported firing upon and hurling lances at the survivors attempting to climb aboard the Mauritius.

Nearly 400 years later, in 1992, the wreck was discovered by French underwater archaeologist Franck Goddio; and a total of 34,407 artifacts and ecofacts were recovered from the shipwreck, including Chinese porcelain, Japanese katanas, Portuguese cannons and Mexican coins. The San Diego exhibition toured the globe before it started to be permanently displayed at the National Museum of Anthropology in Manila. The Naval Museum in Madrid has also featured a display.

== History ==
=== Origin ===
The San Diego was formerly known as San Antonio, a trading ship built in Cebu under the supervision of European boatbuilders. It was docked at the port of Cavite to undergo reconditioning and repair; but at the end of October 1600, Don Antonio de Morga, Vice-Governor General of the Philippines, ordered it converted into a warship and renamed it San Diego.

=== A threatened Manila organizes its defense ===
People in Manila knew that the Dutch were planning to invade Philippine waters. In response to it, Manila immediately set about preparing its defense. Simultaneously, it took measures to fortify the capital and Cavite, its port and arsenal, and armed several ships to pursue the enemy.

Morga commanded the operation. The Spanish fleet set sail on December 12, 1600. The fleet was composed of two ships and supported by smaller native boats.

On December 13, the battle plan was prepared and the battle between the San Diego and the Mauritius began at dawn on the 14th, in a strong wind and heavy seas.

=== The sinking of San Diego ===
On December 14, 1600, about 50 kilometers southwest of Manila, the Spanish battleship San Diego clashed with the Dutch ship Mauritius. All odds were in favor of the Spanish. The San Diego was four times larger than the Mauritius; it had a crew of 450 rested men and massive fire power with 14 cannons taken from the fortress in Manila.

Unfortunately, this was also the weakness of the San Diego. Morga had the ship full of people, weapons, and munitions but too little ballast to weigh the ship down for easier maneuverability. While the gun ports had been widened for more firing range, not one cannon could be fired because water entered through the enlarged holes.

The San Diego sprang a leak beneath the waterline either from the first cannonball fired by the Mauritius or from the impact of ramming the Dutch at full speed. Because of inexperience, Morga failed to issue orders to save the San Diego. It sank "like a stone" when he ordered his men to cast off from the burning Mauritius.

The events were recorded in Morga's book Sucesos de las Islas Filipinas, which portrayed Morga as a hero of the battle. Olivier van Noort also wrote about the battle.

== Discovery ==
The accounts of the battle of the San Diego and the Mauritius are incomplete. To rectify this, Patrick Lize, a historian, conducted extensive research in the archives of Seville, Madrid, and the Netherlands to look for new information that would shed light on the battle. From the testimony of 22 survivors, memoirs of 2 priests from Manila, and the inventory of both the weapons and provisions on the San Diego, a more accurate reconstruction of the battle was made possible.

Franck Goddio and his team, in coordination with the National Museum and financially supported by Foundation Elf, conducted underwater explorations to find the San Diego. They discovered the wreck about 50 meters deep near Fortune Island, outside of Manila Bay. It was undisturbed and formed a sand-covered hill 25 meters long, 8 meters wide, and 3 meters high. A cannon rising out of the sand with the inscription "Philip II" made the identification easier.

At enormous expense and with modern underwater technology and a team of 50, the San Diego was recovered. From the start, scientists from the National Museum of the Philippines and the Musée national des arts asiatiques in Paris inventoried all the artifacts and took care to ensure the best possible conservation condition.

== Archaeological materials recovered ==
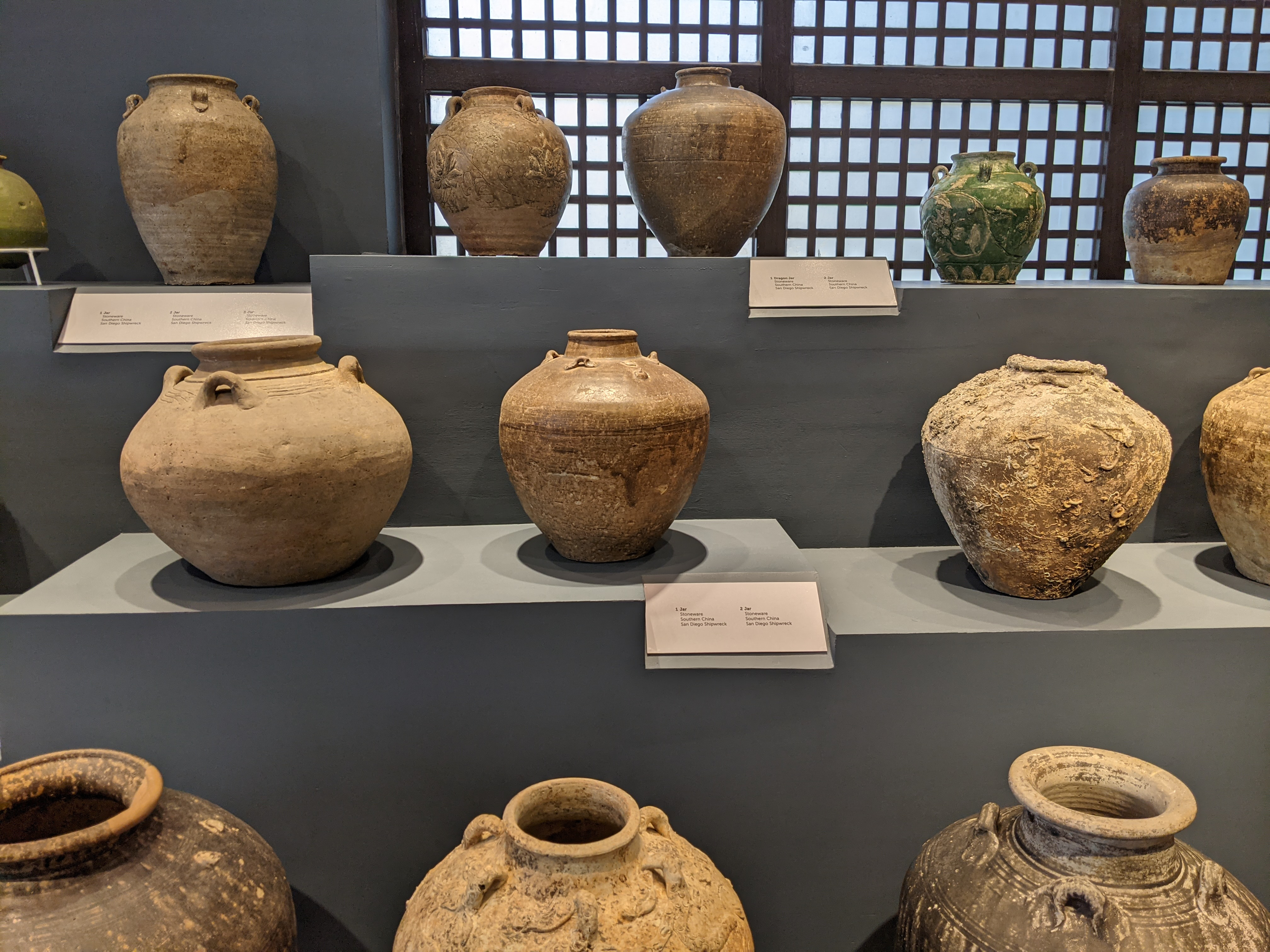
Stone wares recovered from the San Diego shipwreck at the National Museum of the Philippines - Cebu

During the entire period of the project, more than 34,000 archaeological items including shards and broken objects have been recovered from the San Diego site. The archaeological materials recovered include more than five hundred blue-and-white Chinese ceramics in the form of plates, dishes, bottles, kendis, and boxes which may be ascribed to the Wan Li period of the Ming dynasty; more than seven hundred and fifty Chinese, Thai, Burmese, and Spanish or Mexican stoneware jars; over seventy Philippine-made earthenware potteries influenced by European stylistic forms and types; parts of Japanese samurai swords; fourteen bronze cannons of different types and sizes; parts of European muskets; stone and lead cannonballs; metal navigational instruments and implements; silver coins; two iron anchors; animal bones and teeth (pig and chicken); and seed and shell remains (prunes, chestnuts, and coconut). An official seal belonging to Morga was also among the recoveries.

Worthy of note among the metal finds are a navigational compass and a maritime astrolabe. Also retrieved from the site is a block of hardened resin that was noted in historical accounts to have been used for caulking and for making fire in stoves.

A majority of the ceramic wares recovered were intact and many pieces are restorable.

Porcelain	Earthenware materials	Stoneware material	Metals	Organic materials
Intact: 423	Intact: 78	Intact: 327	Implements: 32	Bones: 2,727
Complete: 51	Complete: 14	Complete: 106	Gold Ornaments: 2	Wood: 191
Restorable: 242	Restorable: 22	Restorable: 171	Buckles: 104	Rope: 134
Broken: 164	Broken: 75	Broken: 261	Buttons: 6	Charcoal: 10
Fragments: 548	Fragments: 473	Fragments: 2,165	Coins: 139	Coconut Husk: 2
Sherds: 2,260	Sherds: 758	Sherds: 920	Lockets: 66	Cork: 1
Unclassified: 792	Unclassified: 62	Unclassified: 239	Sword Fragments: 31	Ivory: 6
			Musketball: 17,189	Resin: 4
			Cannonball: 197	Shell: 2
			Lead Ingots: 5	Teeth: 2
			Cannons: 14	Tusk: 1
			Spanish Morion Helmet: 3	Bark: 2
			Spanish Armor: shoulder guard, partial breastplate neck guard	Bead: 1
			Unclassified: 3,330	Seed: 55
Total: 4,480	Total: 1,482	Total: 4,189	Total: 21,118	Total: 3,138
				Grand Total: 34,407

=== Conservation of artifacts ===
Once the condition of artifacts in the seabed is changed in any way, the conservation of archaeological objects recovered from underwater excavations commences. At this point, the conservator prevents any physical or chemical changes in the objects recovered.

The effects of soluble salts, biodegradation, and desiccation that cause further deterioration of artifacts are controlled. Salts promote and cause physical damage. Bacteria and fungi breakdown the structure and feed off the materials that make up the object.

The active corrosion products on metal artifacts and the thick deposits of concretions on fragile ceramic vessels posed challenges as well as difficulties for the conservator.

All artifacts recovered from the wreck site were desalinated. Concretions were removed mechanically and the remaining calcareous materials were subjected to chemical cleaning. The objects were chemically stabilized after all the organic and inorganic impurities had been removed. This is done to prevent further corrosion and damage.

== Documentary film ==
- Die Schätze der San Diego – Tauchfahrt in die Vergangenheit. ARD-Dokumentation (1997). Regie: Torsten Sasse. (DVD in German/English/Spanish)
