= The Hispanic American Historical Review =

Hispanic American Historical Review
- Discipline: Latin American History
- Language: English
- Edited by: Martha Few; Zachary R. Morgan; Matthew Restall; Amara Solari

Publication details
- History: 1918–present
- Publisher: Duke University Press for the Conference on Latin American History (United States)
- Frequency: Quarterly

Standard abbreviations
- ISO 4: Hisp. Am. Hist. Rev.

Links
- Journal homepage

The Hispanic American Historical Review is a quarterly, peer-reviewed, scholarly journal of Latin American history, the official publication of the Conference on Latin American History, the professional organization of Latin American historians. Founded in 1916, HAHR is the oldest journal of Latin American history, and, since 1926, published by Duke University Press. On July 1, 2017, editorial responsibility shifted from Duke University to Penn State for the 2017–2022 term.

== History ==
The journal was founded by a group of Latin American historians within the American Historical Association, who met to create an institutional structure for this branch of history. Latin-Americanists felt marginalized within the AHA, with few sessions at the annual meeting and limited space within The American Historical Review. The Hispanic American Historical Review was founded in 1916 at the Cincinnati meeting of the AHA, originally to have had the title Ibero-American Historical Review. In the journal's first issue in 1918, J. Franklin Jameson, one of the founders of the American Historical Association, greeted HAHR's establishment as a step forward, indicating the growth of Latin American history as a field. The journal had an initial editorial board of six, Charles E. Chapman, Isaac J. Cox, Julius Klein, William R. Manning, James A. Robertson, and William Spence Robertson, and two advisory editors, Herbert E. Bolton and William R. Shepherd.

The journal published issues for four years, but foundered for lack of funding until in 1926, when Duke University Press stepped in, housing the journal and providing financial support, putting the journal on a firm basis since then. The journal predates the founding of the Conference on Latin American History in 1926 as an entity within the American Historical Association. Until the 1944 founding of the journal The Americas, HAHR was the main outlet for publication of scholarly articles on Latin American history.

In 1949, the journal published three articles that assessed the history of its first thirty years. Lesley Byrd Simpson's article contains a series of tabulations of articles by time period and found that only 10% dealt with the twentieth century, 44% on the nineteenth century, with the colonial period having 14% for the sixteenth century, 15% for the eighteenth century, 4.5 for general colonial era articles, and just 4% for the seventeenth century. Mexico had the most articles dealing with its history, at 24%, with Brazil 11.5%, the Caribbean (The Antilles), 11.5% and Spanish borderlands now part of the U.S. 10%. In terms of fields, diplomatic history had the most articles at 28%, biography 16%, economic history 13%, social history 12%, and institutional history 10%. Simpson urged a "genetic approach to historical problems without which we cannot hope to expand our horizons." Another article on the occasion of the 30th volume of HAHR was by Charles W. Hackett, who also did tabulations of the corpus, identifying authors with the most publications. The third assessment, by Howard F. Cline, called for "some serious consideration of the methods which were an outgrowth of the 'New History'" and "to restore to our particular historiography a depth of insight, a part of its humanistic base," with young historians immersing themselves in the historiographical traditions of the field.

In 1960, HAHR published the translation of an analysis of the journal's content by a Soviet scholar of Latin America, I.R. Lavretskii. HAHR's editors' aim in publishing it was to "demonstrate what Soviet historians are doing in Latin American history." Lavretskii's article was preceded a brief one by J. Gregory Oswald, "A Soviet Criticism of the Hispanic American Historical Review", in which he suggests that based on Lavretskii's article "historical scholarship in the U.S. S. R. remains a branch of politics." Lavretskii's article assesses a number of HAHR articles and concludes by saying "A survey of HAHR materials indicates that the official Latin Americanists of the U.S. falsify and distort the historical truth in order to benefit imperialism." Letters to the editor followed, but the journal demurred in publishing them. "For the HAHR to publish rebuttals of only a few of the statements would suggest that the remaining ones stand as correct and acceptable, an impression which would be unfair to the other capitalistic historians who were singled out for attention."

== Journal information ==
There are four issues per year in February, May, August, and November, which are published in a bound paper version and an electronic version. Issues contain three to five articles, occasionally a discussion forum, thirty to forty-five book reviews, and obituaries, as well as advertisements for books in the field. Each issue typically runs 200 pages. Some issues have thematically related articles. Book reviews are categorized by time period: longue durée, precontact, fifteenth–seventeenth centuries, eighteenth–nineteenth centuries, and twentieth–twenty-first centuries. There are book reviews of varying length, generally of a single monograph or edited volume. Articles are submitted to a peer-review process. Book reviews are solicited by the journal.

One or more scholars serve as editors of the journal with an advisory board whose members serve five-year terms. The editor(s) are part of the executive committee of the Conference on Latin American History. The James A. Robertson Award of CLAH is for the best article published in HAHR in a given year.
