= The Philippine Islands, 1493–1898 =

Series of Philippine historical documents

The Philippine Islands, 1493–1803
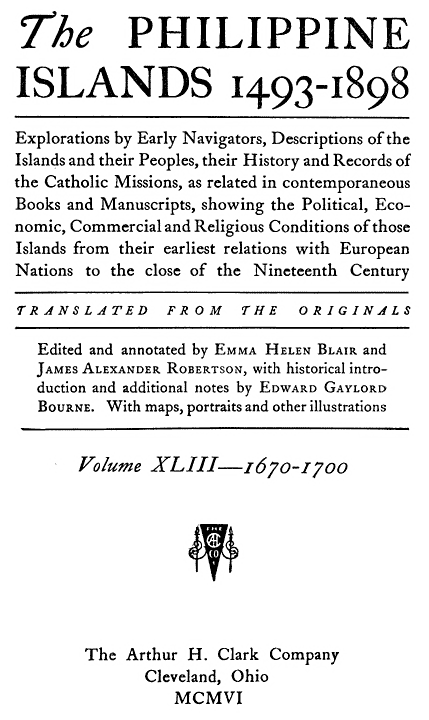
- Title page for one of the many volumes of The Philippine Islands, 1493–1898
- Author: Emma Helen Blair, James Alexander Robertson
- Translator: Emma Helen Blair; James Alexander Robertson
- Language: English
- Subject: Philippine history
- Genre: History
- Published: Cleveland
- Publisher: Arthur H. Clark Company
- Publication date: 1903-1909
- Publication place: United States

The Philippine Islands, 1493–1898, often referred to as Blair and Robertson after its two authors, was a 55-volume series of Philippine historical documents. They were translated by Emma Helen Blair and James Alexander Robertson, a director of the National Library of the Philippines from 1910 to 1916.

== Publication history ==
The original 55-volume set was published from 1903 through 1909 by the Arthur H. Clark Company in Cleveland, Ohio. No more than 500 sets were printed and sold between 1903 and 1909. In 1962, a reissue by photo-offset was printed in Taipeh, limited to 300 sets.

== Reception ==
While the series is still considered an important source of Philippine history for non-Spanish speakers, it has been criticized by modern historians, notably Glòria Cano, for deliberately distorting the original Spanish documents to portray the Spanish colonial rule in a negative light (the Spanish "black legend") as part of the general American political strategy of pacifying the Philippines during the American colonial period.
