= Naval Museum of Madrid =

Naval museum in Madrid, Spain

Naval Museum
- Spanish: Museo Naval

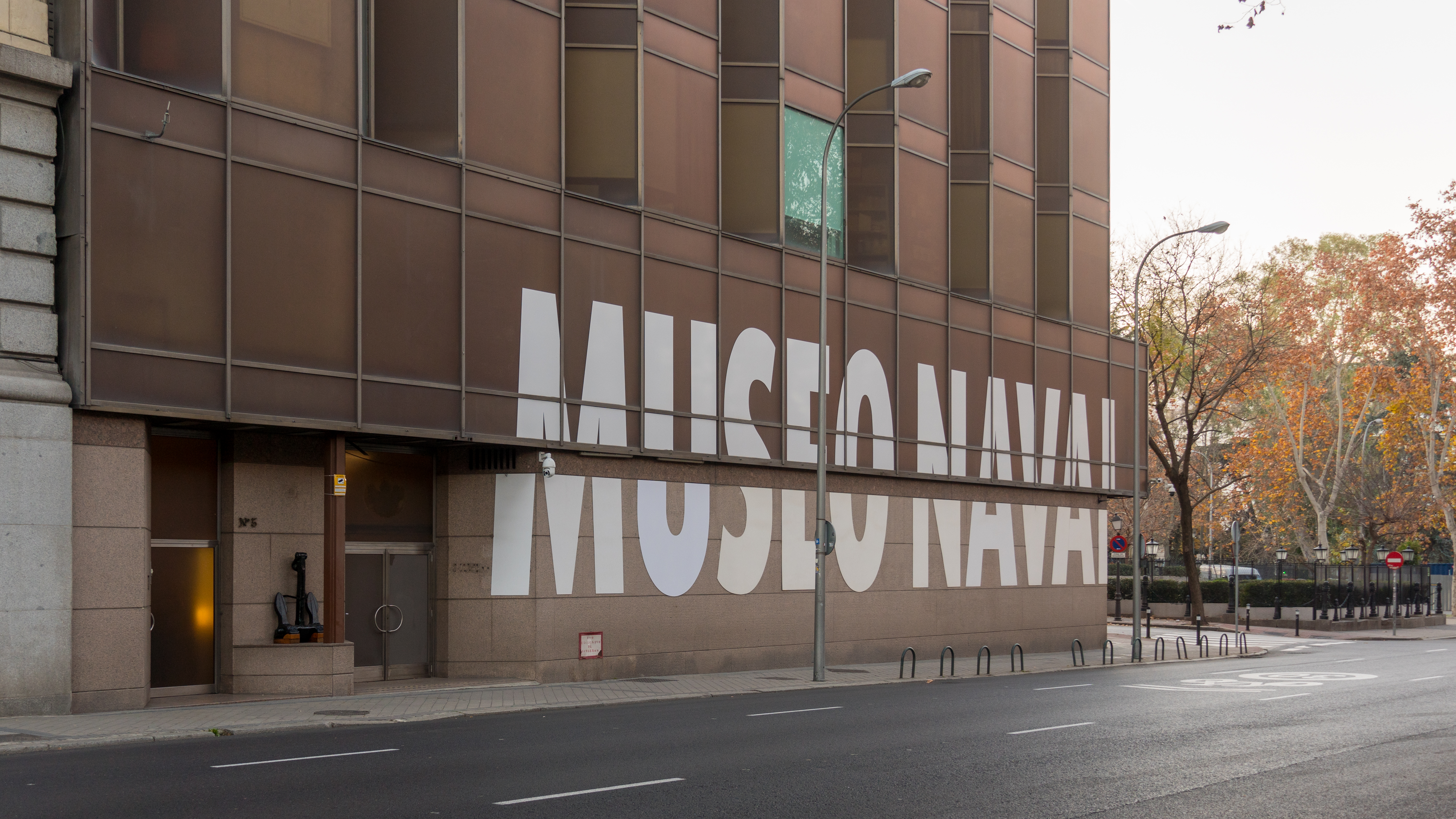
- Established: 1843
- Location: Paseo del Prado 5, Madrid, Spain
- Coordinates: 40.417456°N 3.692804°W
- Type: Naval museum
- Website: Official website

The Naval Museum (Spanish: Museo Naval) is a naval museum in Madrid, Spain, devoted to the history of the Spanish Navy since the Catholic Monarchs, in the 15th century, up to the present. It is one of the National Museums of Spain and it is attached to the Ministry of Defence.

The displays set naval history in a wide context with information about the history of the Spanish Empire. The collections include navigation instruments, weapons, maps and paintings.

== The building ==
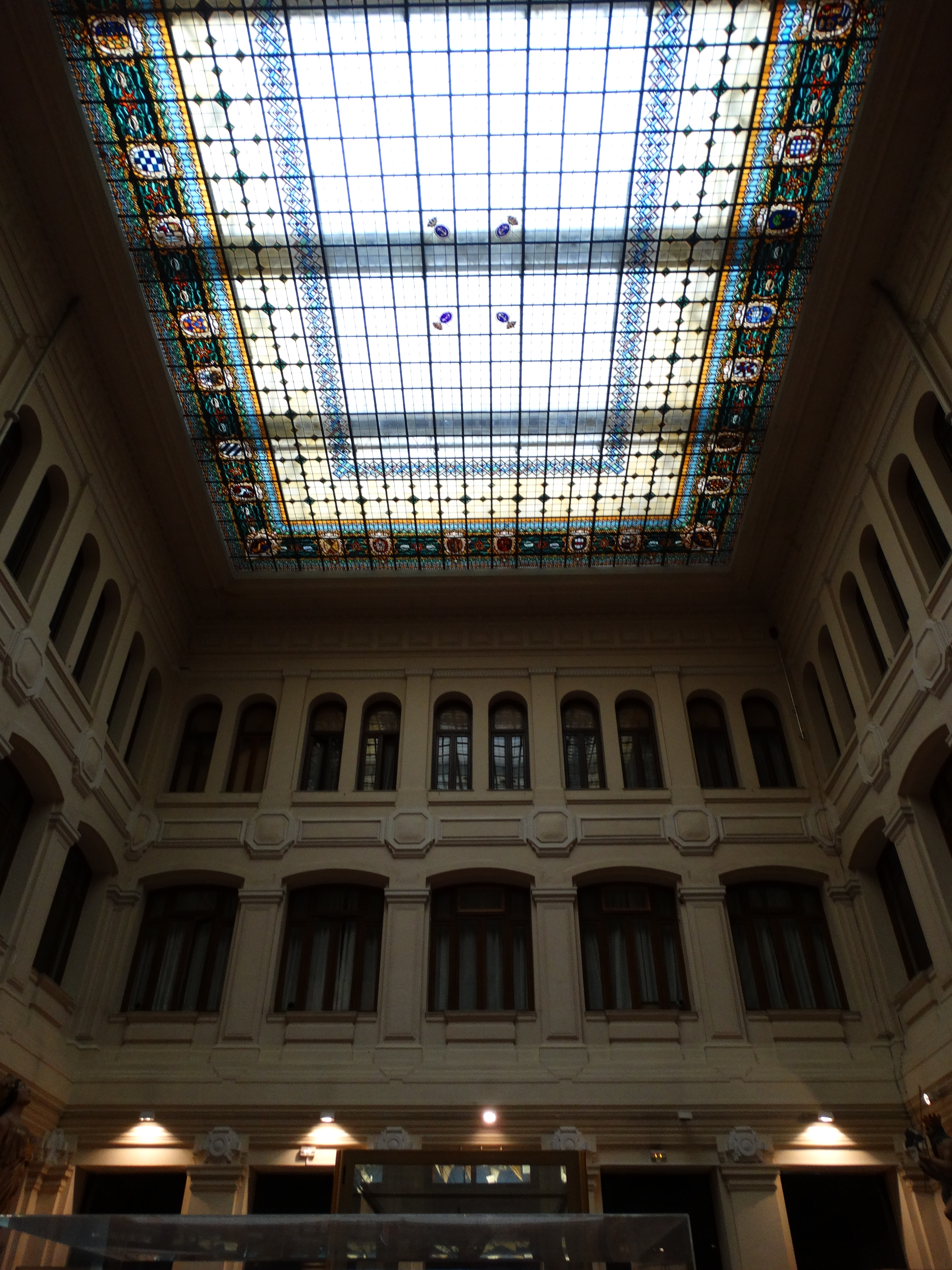
Central courtyard

Its origins date back to a royal decree issued on 28 September 1792, yet it was not until 1843 when the Museum was inaugurated in Madrid by Ramon de Romay y Jimenez-Cisneros, initially housed in the Palacio de los Consejos. It was soon moved to the Casa del Platero and then to the Palacio de los Ministerios, where it remained until 1932.

The Ministry of the Navy (there used to be a standalone ministerial department for the Navy, fused with those for the Army and the Air Forces in 1977) was provided with a new headquarters in the 1920s, and the museum moved there in 1932. The architects were José Espelius and Francisco Javier de Luque.

Visitors enter the museum through a modernist facade on the Paseo del Prado, and pass to the first floor where former courtyards (now exhibition halls of the Naval Museum) are covered by spectacular stained-glass roofs with naval and decorative motifs made by Maumejean (a family glass-making business which had a branch in Spain). At weekends a doorway onto the grand staircase of Navy Headquarters is opened to allow visitors to appreciate the architecture.

== Collections ==
The map of Juan de la Cosa, the earliest preserved map of the Americas, is on permanent display in this museum.

Since 2007, the museum has hosted a specimen of Moon rock. One of two such samples given to Spain, it was collected on the 1972 Apollo 17 mission. The rock, which weighs one gram, was put on display in 2009, to mark the 40th anniversary of the first Moon landing. The museum also displays a collection of Ming ceramics rescued from the shipwreck of the San Diego.

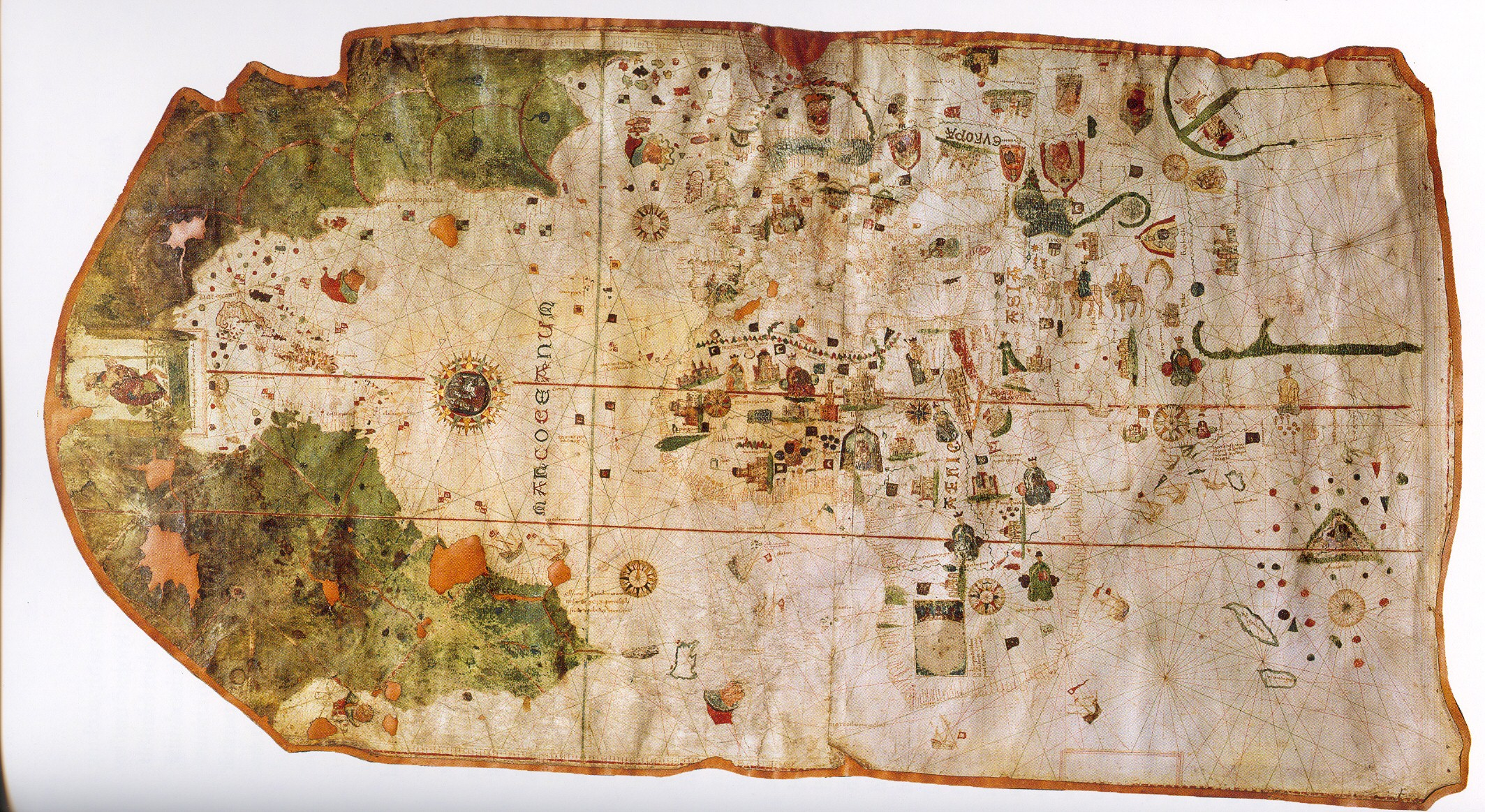
Map of Juan de la Cosa made in 1500 in El Puerto de Santa María

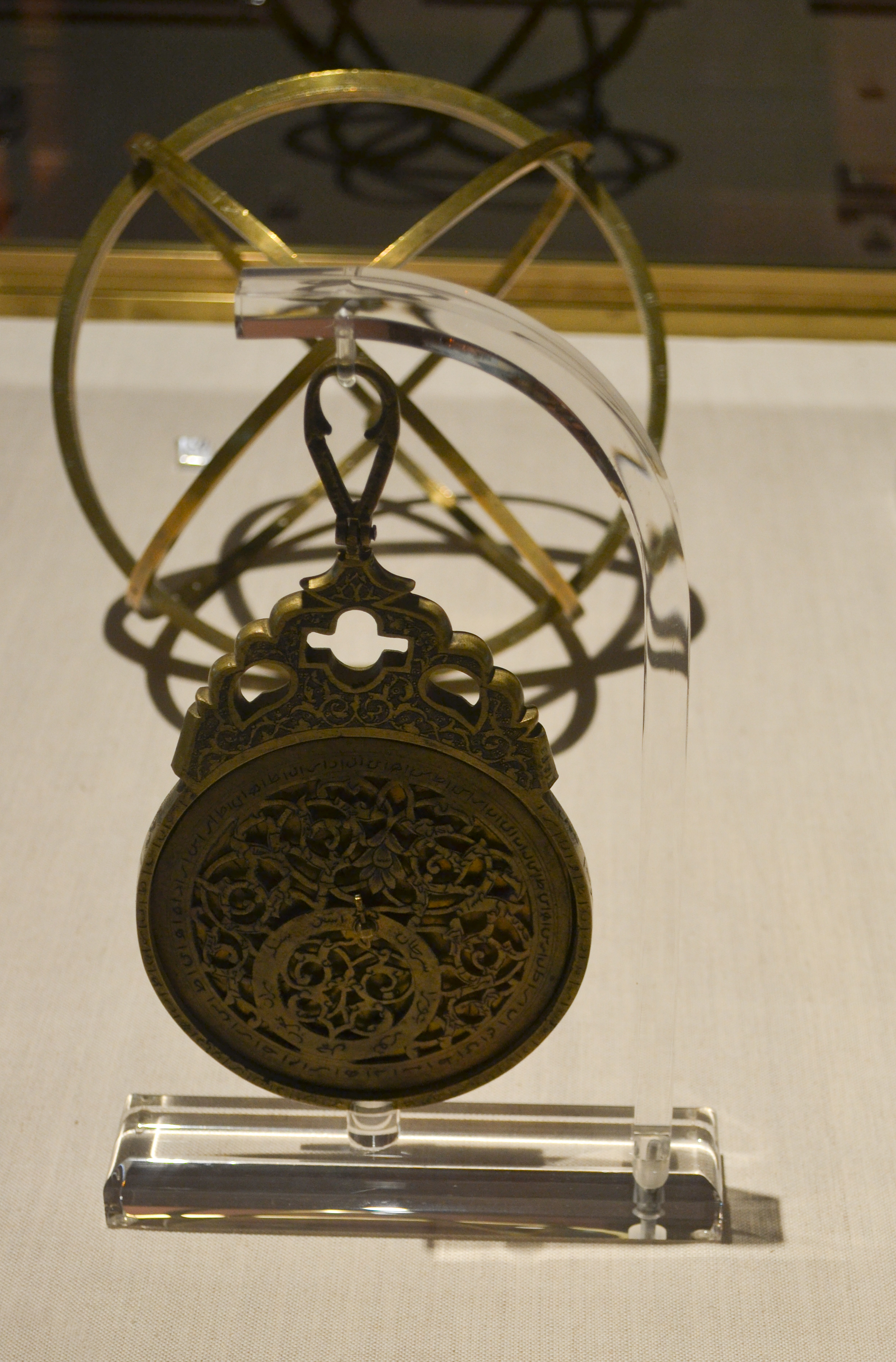
An astrolabe mater (c. 1570)

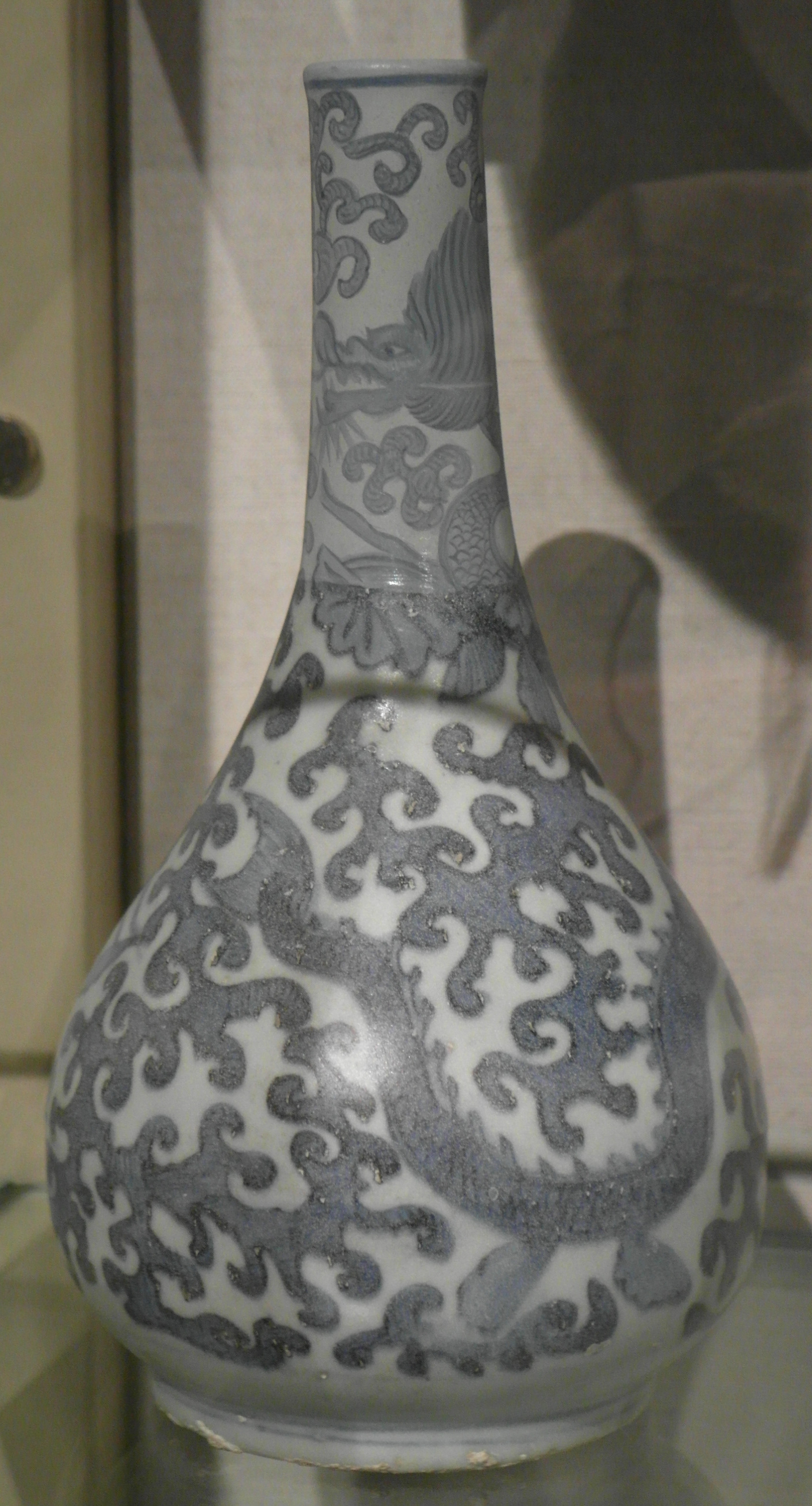
Ming ceramics from the San Diego shipwreck

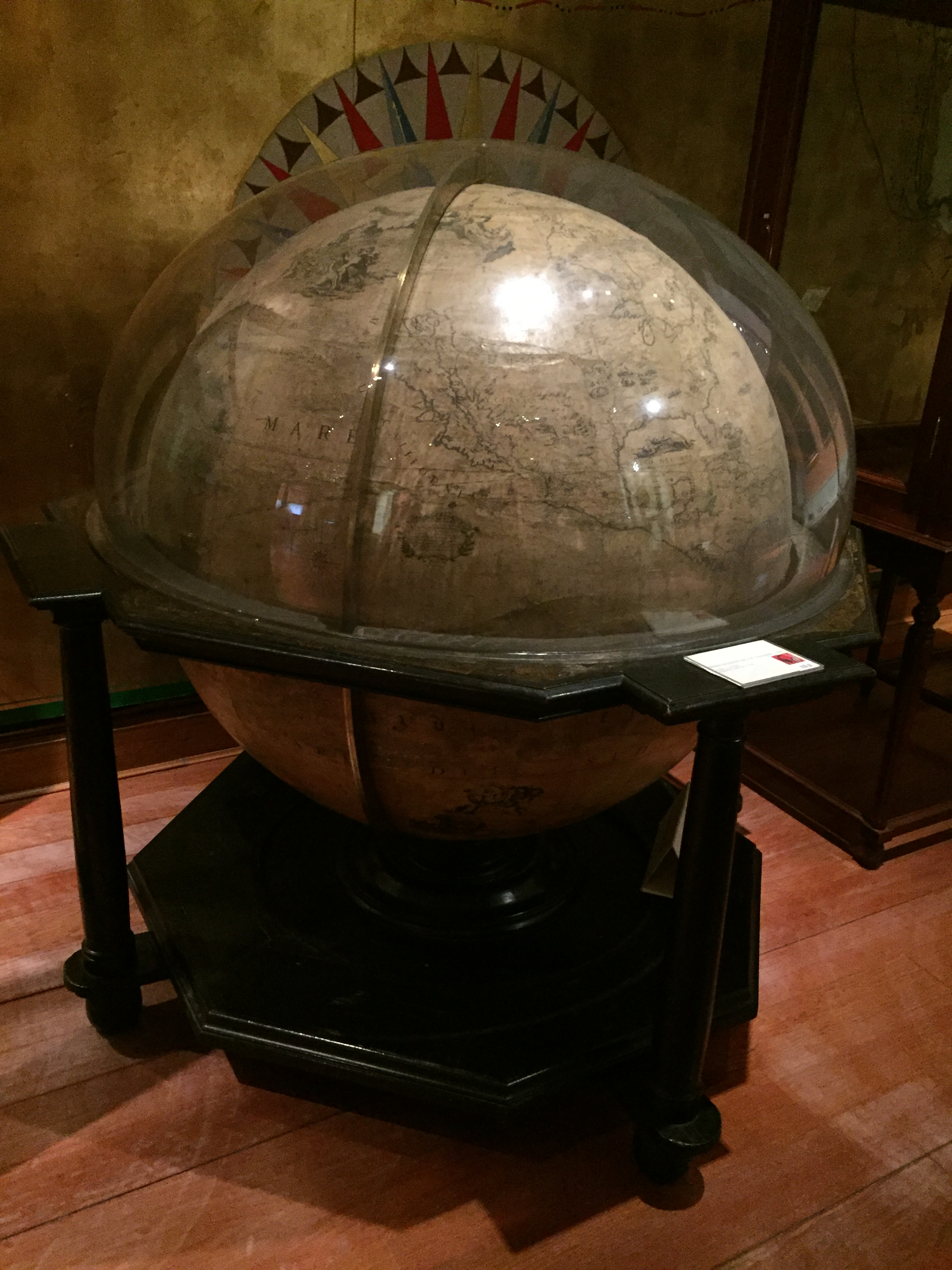
1688 globe by Vincenzo Coronelli

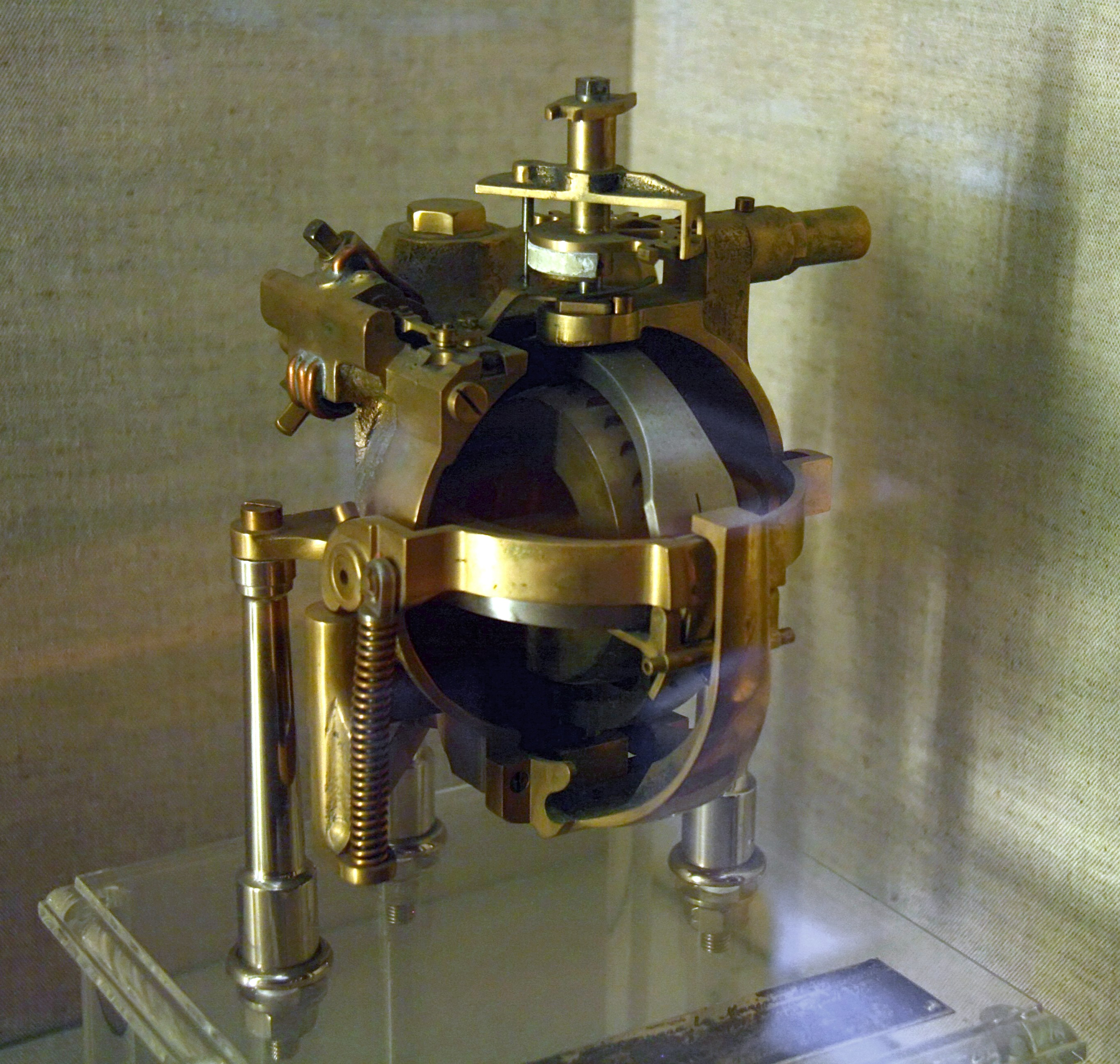
Torpedo gyroscope made in 1929 in Cartagena

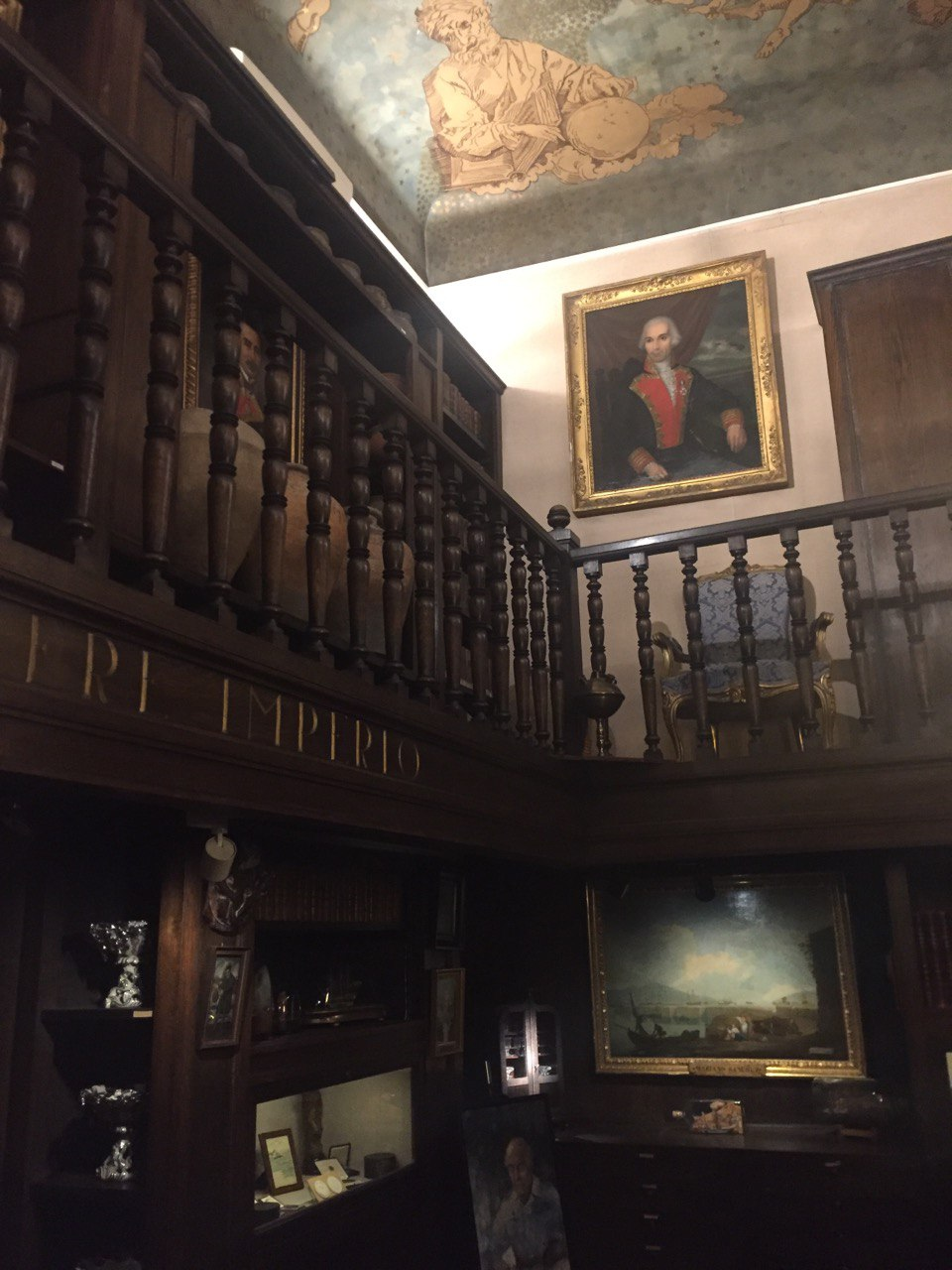
Sala "Almirante Jose Ignacio Gonzalez-Aller"

== Incidents ==
On 13 October 2025, two activists from the Futuro Vegetal movement were arrested for defacing José Garnelo's painting Primer homenaje a Cristóbal Colón at the museum by throwing biodegradable red paint on the artwork during Spain's National Day. The activists carried a banner reading "12 October, nothing to celebrate. Ecosocial justice." The painting was quickly restored by museum staff, and visitors were temporarily evacuated during the incident.

== Notes and references ==
=== Bibliography ===
- Riaño Lozano, Fernando (2002). "El Museo Naval y el Instituto de Historia y Cultura Naval". Arbor. 173 (682). Madrid: Consejo Superior de Investigaciones Científicas: 405–419. doi:10.3989/arbor.2002.i682.1131. ISSN 0210-1963.
