= Fortune Island (Philippines) =

Island in Batangas, Philippines

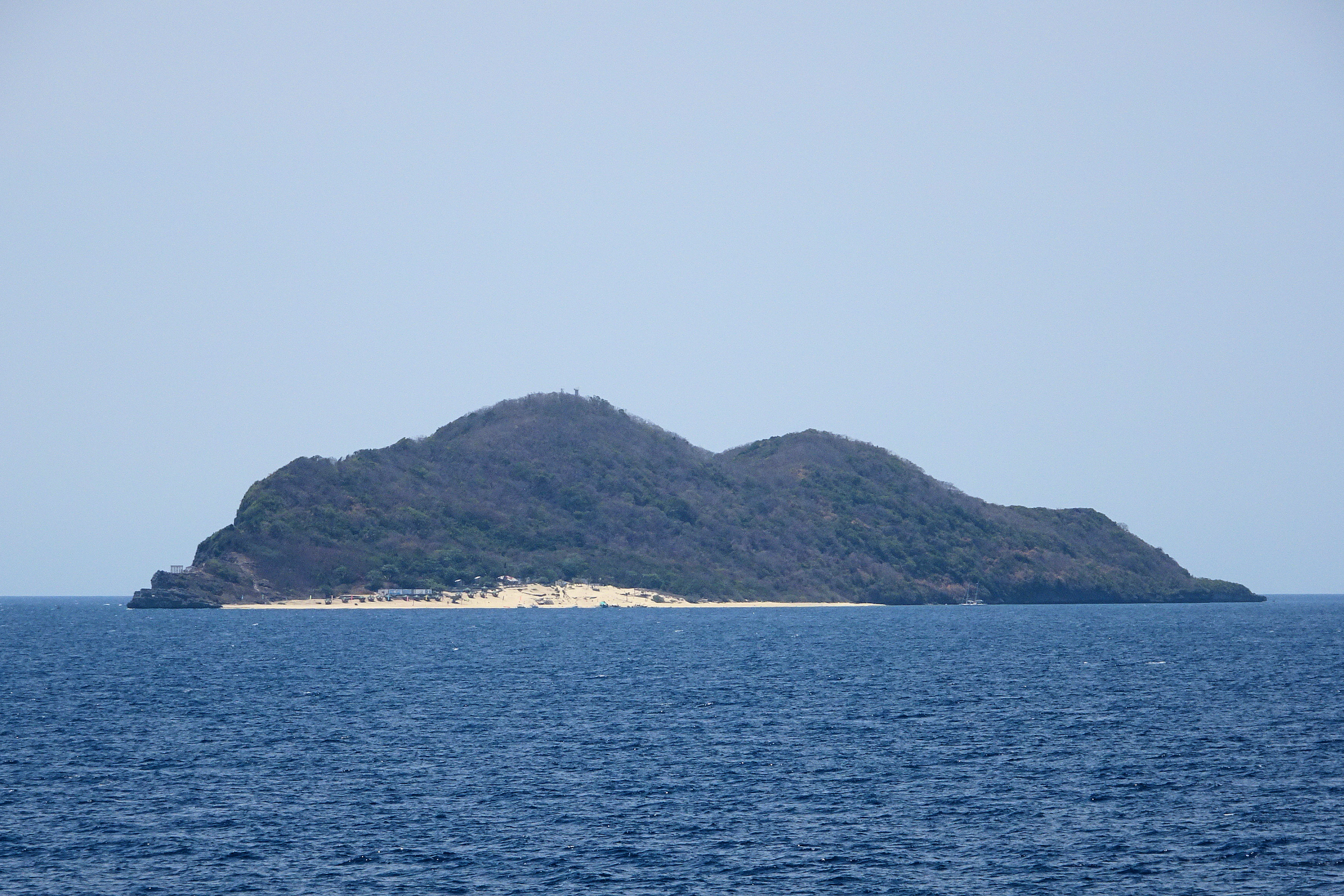

- Location within Luzon Location within Philippines

Geography
- Coordinates: 14°3′24″N 120°29′28″E
- Adjacent to: South China Sea
- Area: 27 ha (67 acres)
- Highest elevation: 98 m (322 ft)

Administration
- Philippines
- Region: Calabarzon
- Province: Batangas
- Municipality: Nasugbu

Additional information

Fortune Island is a resort island of Batangas province in the Philippines. The 27-hectare (67-acre) island lies about 14 kilometers (8.7 mi) off the coast of Nasugbu in Batangas.

== Ownership and development ==
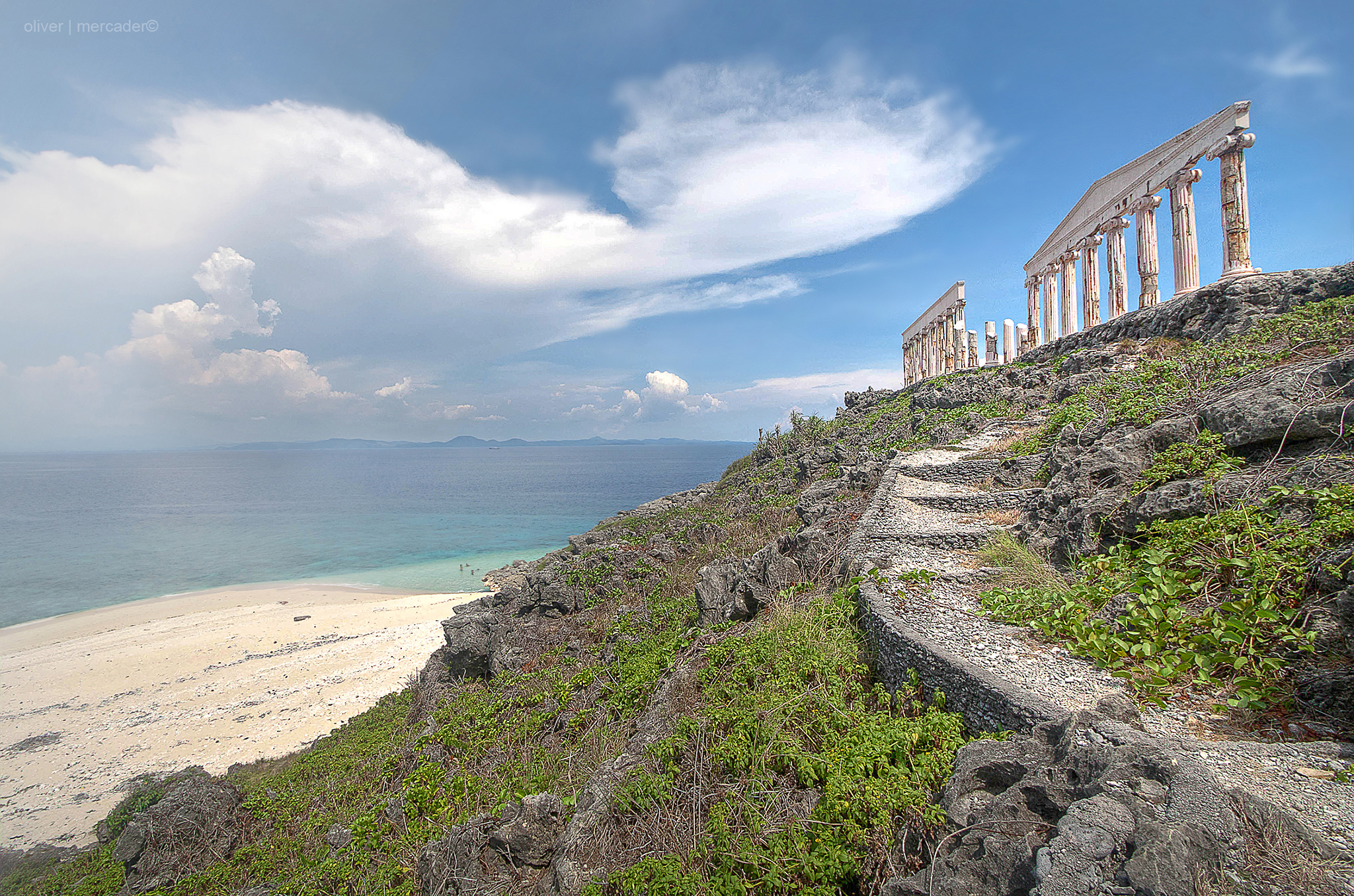
The "ruins" on the island patterned after Ancient Greek architecture ruins.

Fortune Island was once a private island owned by Laurentina Pestano. It was turned over to the government and the island is now owned by José Antonio Leviste, a former governor of Batangas. Leviste opened the Fortune Island Resort Club on the island in 1995. The beach resort was built along a 20-meter (66-foot) stretch of pristine white sand. Several rest houses face the water. The resort features a salt water swimming pool, clubhouse, cabana, basketball court, helipad, desalinator for freshwater consumption, and a small serpentarium, a reptile zoo for snakes. The beach also has an acropolis with Grecian pillars and statues on the edge of the island overlooking the sea. There is also a museum dedicated to the San Diego, a Spanish warship that sank off the island (see below).

This island has since been parceled out into seven lots reportedly titled in the names of three companies: Fortune Resort Club, Inc.; Meridian Pacific Hotel Corp.; and Batangas Bay Development, Inc. Leviste holds either majority stocks or has interests in these companies.

=== Questions regarding Leviste's and later companies' ownership of the island ===
Some government officials believe that Leviste's ownership of Fortune Island underwent “scheming procedures” to acquire both judicial and administrative titles. These officials believe that these titles should never have been granted for two reasons: firstly, the island is classified as a marine reserve under Proclamation 1801, issued in 1978 by President Ferdinand Marcos; and, secondly, by Section 16 of Presidential Decree 705 (the Revised Forestry Code), which provides that "areas less than 250 hectares which are far from, or are not contiguous with, any certified alienable and disposable land" are "areas needed for forest purposes and may not, therefore, be classified as alienable and disposable land." Some government officials further contend that subdividing Fortune Island into lots was a "ploy" to skirt environmental and other pertinent laws.

Nevertheless, the DENR, which had repeatedly reviewed the case of Fortune Island through the years, has yet to decide on pursuing a case in court against any and all private ownership of the island, even while continuously holding the conclusion that the island is inalienable public land.

== Shipwrecks ==
It was near this island (approximately 900 meters (3,000 feet) northwest of the island) that the galleon San Diego was sunk on December 14, 1600, by the Dutch warship Mauritius under the command of Admiral Oliver Van Noort. The shipwreck was discovered in 1992 by French underwater archaeologist Franck Goddio.

The island has also been the site of modern shipwrecks. On December 13, 1995, the MV Kimelody Cristy, a passenger ferry owned and operated by Moreta Shipping Lines Incorporated, caught fire and sank off Fortune Island as it was on its way to Mindoro, leaving 17 people dead and 16 people missing. On September 18, 1998, the MV Princess of the Orient, a passenger ferry owned by Sulpicio Lines, sailed during a typhoon on its way to Cebu City from Manila and sank off Fortune Island, resulting in the deaths of 70 people.
