= Olivier van Noort =

Dutch privateer

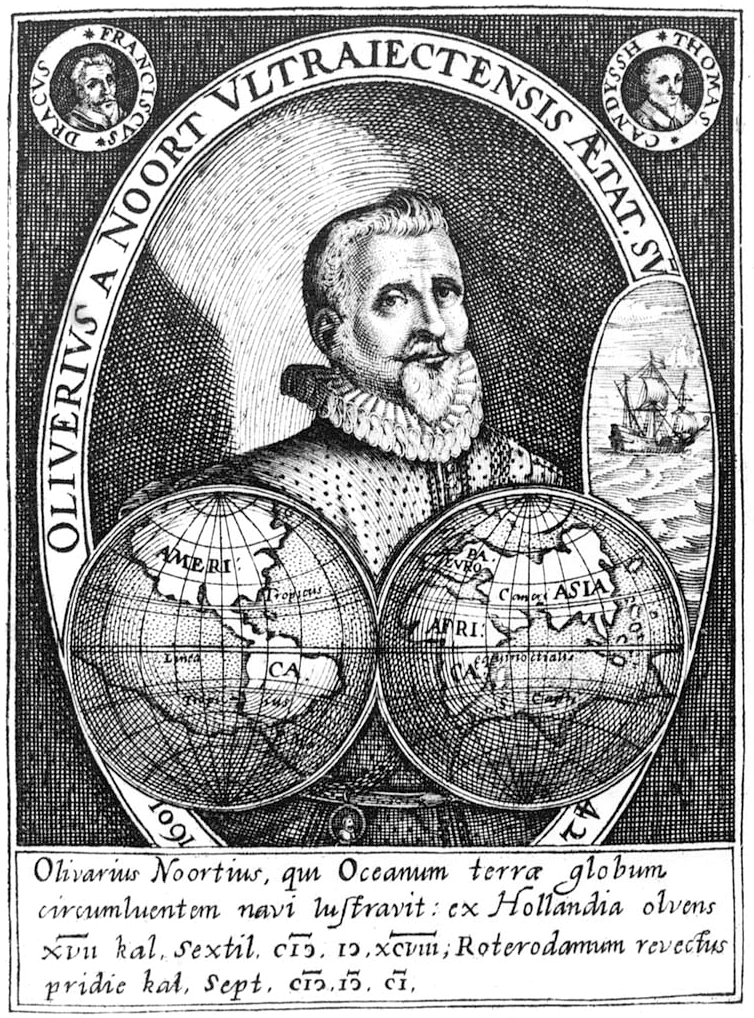
- Dutchman, maritime explorer
- Born: 1558; Utrecht, Lordship of Utrecht, Holy Roman Empire
- Died: 22 February 1627 (aged 68–69); Schoonhoven, Dutch Republic
- Known for: First Dutchman to circumnavigate the world.

Olivier van Noort (1558 – 22 February 1627) was a Dutch merchant captain and the first Dutchman to circumnavigate the world.

== Early life ==
Olivier van Noort was born in 1558 in Utrecht.

== Voyage ==
He left Rotterdam on 2 July 1598 with four ships to find an alternative trade route to China and the Spice Islands during the Dutch Eighty Years' War with Spain and Portugal. His ships were poorly equipped, especially in the way of armament, and the crews were unruly.

Van Noort sailed through the Strait of Magellan, and captured a number of Spanish and Portuguese ships along the Pacific coast of South America. While in the strait his men killed around forty indigenous Selkʼnam, in what was the bloodiest recorded event in the strait until then.

He lost two ships on the way due to a storm, including his largest ship, the Hendrick Frederick, which was wrecked on Ternate in the Maluku Islands. In November and December 1600, he established a berth for his two remaining ships, Mauritius and Eendracht, in the surroundings of Corregidor Island at Manila Bay in the Philippines.

From there he engaged in attacks on Spanish ships, targeting the sailing route to and from Manila. This situation was ended after the naval combat of Fortune Island on December 14, 1600. The Spanish lost their flagship, the galleon San Diego (its wreck would be found in 1992 and yield a treasure in porcelain and gold pieces) but the Spanish captured the Dutch Eendracht, making van Noort's position untenable and forcing him to retire from the Philippines.

Van Noort returned to Rotterdam via what would become the Dutch East Indies and the Cape of Good Hope, on 26 August 1601 with his last ship, the Mauritius, and 45 of the original 248 crew. The venture barely broke even, but was the inspiration for more such expeditions. The united Dutch East India Company was formed a few months later.

== Legacy ==
Van Noort's voyage is also told by Hans Koning in the book The Golden Keys (Doubleday 1956, 1970), a fictionalized retelling of the voyage for children.
