= Emma Helen Blair =

American historian, journalist and editor

Emma Helen Blair (September 12, 1851 – September 25, 1911) was an American historian, journalist and editor, whose most notable work was a documentary history of the Philippines.

== Biography ==
Emma Helen Blair was born on September 12, 1851, in Menasha, Wisconsin. Although born in Wisconsin, she attended high school in Westfield, Massachusetts. In 1871, she returned to Wisconsin and enrolled in Ripon College, where she graduated in 1874. After graduation she taught in public school for two years and then moved to Milwaukee, where she worked as a journalist. In 1892, she began postgraduate work in history, economics and sociology at the University of Wisconsin. She later became a librarian at the Wisconsin Historical Society.

In 1894, Blair resigned from the library staff and became assistant to Reuben Gold Thwaites. Thwaites was the translator of the 73-volume work Jesuit Relations (1896–1901). This massive work consisted of English translations of the annual reports issued by the superior of the Jesuit missions in New France to the Jesuit overseer in France between the years 1632 and 1673. Blair participated in the editing and annotations. After her work on the Jesuit Relations, she assisted in the editing of the journal of Father Louis Hennepin and of the journals of the Lewis and Clark Expedition, still working with Thwaites.

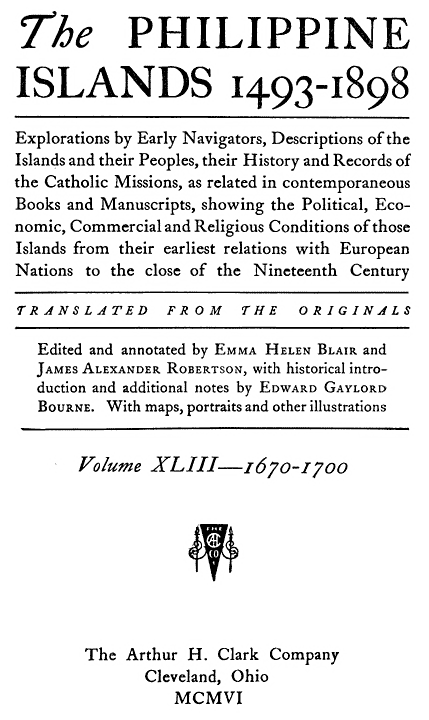
Title page for one of the many volumes of The Philippine Islands, 1493-1898

In 1903, she began work on the project she is most remembered for, the translation and editing of Philippine historical documents that were published in the 55-volume series The Philippine Islands, 1493–1898 (1903–09). Her collaborator was James A. Robertson, later librarian at the Philippines Library in Manila. Most of the documents in this enormous collection had not previously been translated into English. Volumes 15 and 16 consist of Antonio de Morga's History of the Philippine Islands From Their Discovery by Magellan in 1521 to the Beginning of the XVII Century, an extremely valuable source on the early history of the islands.

Her last work was the translation and editing of documents for The Indian Tribes of the Upper Mississippi Valley and Region of the Great Lakes (2 vols., 1911–12). This work included Nicolas Perrot's Memoir: The Habits and Customs of the American Indians. Just days after receiving an advance copy of volume 1 from the bindery, Blair died in Madison, Wisconsin on September 25, 1911.

According to her obituary in the Madison Democrat,

Miss Blair became by dint of native ability and years of preparatory toil one of the most expert historical editors in the county. She had acquired a complete mastery of the French and Spanish languages. Her literary style was incisive, her historical judgment clear and accurate, and her knowledge of the details of typography quite unusual. In recognition of these qualities Ripon College and the State University honored her with degrees.
