= James Alexander Robertson =

American academic historian

- Born: August 19, 1873; Corry, Pennsylvania
- Died: March 20, 1939 (aged 65); Annapolis, Maryland
- Education: Western Reserve University
- Occupations: Historian, archivist
- Known for: The Philippine Islands, 1493–1898

James Alexander Robertson (August 19, 1873 – March 20, 1939) was an American academic historian, archivist, translator and bibliographer. He is most noted for his contributions to the history and historiography of the Philippines and other former territorial possessions of the Viceroyalty of New Spain.

== Life ==
James Alexander Robertson was born 1873 in Corry, Pennsylvania. He was the sixth of eight children born to Canadian parents, who became naturalized U.S. citizens after relocating to Corry in 1866. His father, John McGregor Robertson, was a building contractor originally from Verulam, Ontario, near Peterborough. His mother, Elizabeth Borrowman Robertson, had emigrated to Canada from her native Scotland as a child.

Robertson's mother died when he was seven. Three years later he and his family moved to Cleveland, Ohio, where James completed his secondary education.

In 1892 he enrolled for graduate studies at Western Reserve University's Adelbert College. He majored in the study of Romance languages, specializing in Old French, and was awarded his Bachelor of Philosophy degree from Western Reserve in 1896.

In 1902 Robertson became involved in the compilation of a massive multivolume work on the history of the Philippines, initially called The Philippine Islands, 1493-1803.

On the completion of the Philippine Islands project Robertson went to the Carnegie Institution of Washington to work in its historical research department (1909–10). In 1910 he moved to Manila and became bibliographer and librarian at the National Library of the Philippines for the next six years. During his time in the Philippines Robertson was instrumental in establishing library science as a discipline for instruction at the University of the Philippines.

Robertson returned to the U.S. and Washington in 1917, taking up a position with the federal Department of Commerce. In 1918 Robertson was the founding editor of the Hispanic American Historical Review, an academic journal devoted to Latin American and Hispanic history. He remained the journal's editor-in-chief until his death.

In 1923 he gained a position as professor at Stetson University in DeLand, Florida, and lectured there for the next ten years. In 1935 he moved to Annapolis, Maryland, as the archivist for the Maryland State Archives' Hall of Records.

Robertson died three years later on March 20, 1939, in Annapolis.
