= Battle of Balasore =

Battle between Mughals and Europeans in Balasore, 1647

- Part of Dano-Mughal War
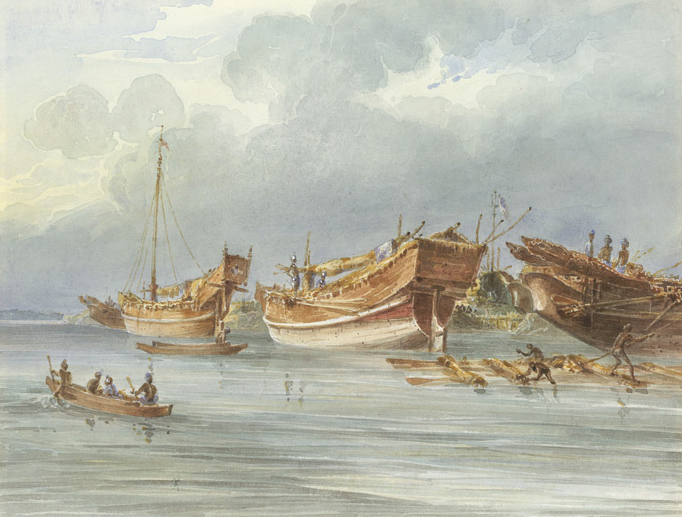
- Moored boats near the Bengali Coast, by Thomas Prinsep in c. 1828.
Date	26 December 1647
Location	Balasore, Bengal Subah (present-day Odisha, India) 21°30′12″N 86°55′30″E
Result	See Aftermath

Belligerents
Danish India	Bengal Subah	British East India (Dutch East India Company) Dutch India

Commanders and leaders
(Danish India) Willem Leyel (Danish India) Christen Clausen	Malik Beg; Local Nawab	Richard Hudson

Units involved
(Danish India) Christianhavn (Danish India) The Bengali Prize	Unknown	Unknown

Strength
5 Ships	Multiple ships 16 guns 1,000 men	+13 ships (Dutch East India Company) 2 ships (Dutch East India Company) 60 men

Casualties and losses
None	1 ship 8 elephants	9–12 ships

The Battle of Balasore (Danish: Slaget ved Balasore) was an engagement between Bengali and English ships against Danish ships at Balasore. When the English failed to persuade the Danes, the Bengalis started attacking the English vessel, yet the English were rescued by the Dutch.

== Background ==
In 1643 Willem Leyel deposed governor Bernt Pessart as overhoved of Danish India. In the preceding year, Pessart had declared war on the Mughal Empire. Leyel continued the privateering war against the Mughals as a source of revenue and income.

In 1647 the privateer war still waged, and in December of that year, a noticeable incident was recorded by the English at Balasore.

== Battle ==
The English at Balasore was given a good reception at Balasore. Yet when a Danish fleet of five ships, including Christianshavn and The Bengali Prize, appeared things suddenly started to change. The Danes had come to settle their long-standing grievances and debts against the Mughal authorities by force.

=== Confrontation with the Danish ===
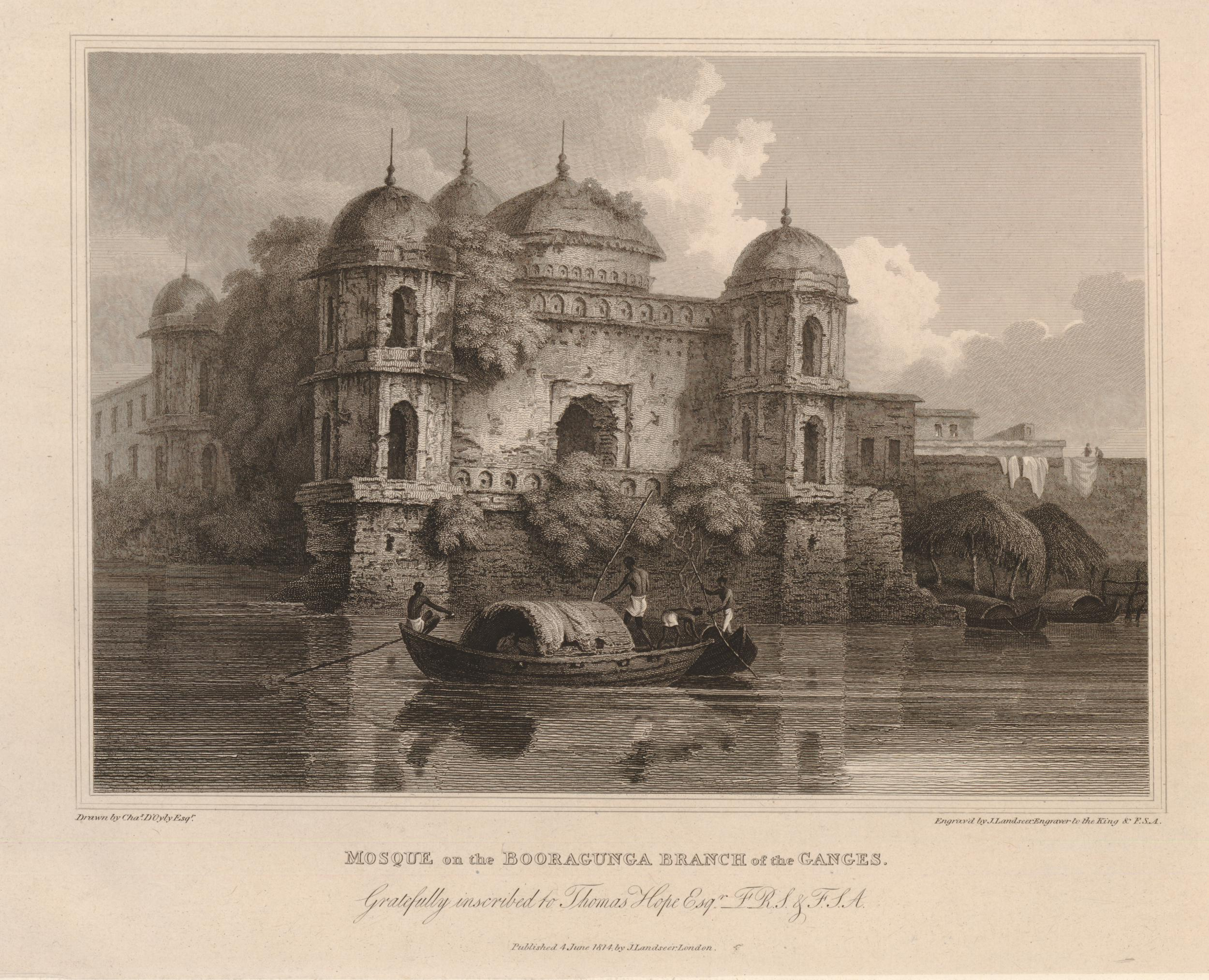
Mosque on the Booragunga Branch of the Ganges. A typical view from Bengal at that time.

Danes seized one of the Moorish ships with eight elephants at the harbour. At the request of Governor Malik Beg, the English twice attempted to persuade the escaping Danish fleet. When this proved a failure for the English, the Mughals informed the English that they now would have to compensate for the damage made by the Danes since both Europeans were Christians.

=== Prelude ===
The English then tried to escape the harbour, yet were blockaded by the Mughals, who placed guns at strategic points and summoned a large force of soldiers. Meanwhile, a letter from the Nawab arrived with a captain and 500 cavalry, demanding to meet the English outside of the town. The English factors refused the demands of the letter.

=== Battle ===
When the Nawab heard the English rejection he called c 1.000 soldiers and placed nine guns in strategic positions around the harbour. The following day additional guns were planted. The English could not leave the harbour and the Budhabalanga River because of a blockade. The Bengalis had already seized 3-4 English boats and 6-8 smaller vessels in the river.

Things escalated when the Bengalis fired at the British warehouse in Balasore. The English took position with their guns and an ensuing confrontation lasted four hours.

Because of the blockade, the Dutch East India Company's business was stopped and was thus forced to join the English course. The Dutch send 60 men and 2 ships to Balasore, which unprovoked the attack on the English.

== Aftermath ==
At the time of the Battle the Danes had presumably already managed to bring themselves and their prize to safety. The war between the Danes and Mughals in Bengal hindered the prospects of trade between the English and Dutch at Balasore.

== See also ==
- First Anglo-Maratha War – Part of Anglo-Maratha Wars between 1775 and 1818
- Cattle War – Conflict between Danish India and the Thanjavur Maratha kingdom
- Loss of the St. Jacob – 1640 grounding of a Danish ship
- Dano-Mughal War – Danish colonial conflict against the Mughal Empire
- Capture of St. Michael – 1644 Danish capture of a Bengali ship
- Skirmish at the Strait of Malacca – Skirmish between Danes and Dutch in Malacca, 1644

== Works cited ==
- Wellen, Kathryn (2015). The Danish East India Company's War against the Mughal Empire, 1642-1698 (PDF). Royal Netherlands Institute for Southeast Asian and Caribbean Studies.
- Bredsdorff, Asta (2009). The Trials and Travels of Willem Leyel. Copenhagen: Museum Tusculanum Press. ISBN 9788763530231.
- Bredsdorff, Asta (1999). Søhistoriske Skrifter (PDF) (in Danish). Vol. XXI. Copenhagen: Handels- og Søfartsmuseet Kronborg.
- Leyel, Willem (1644). Rentekammerafdelingen: Willum Leyels arkiv (1639–1648) (in Danish). Danske Kancelli.
- Sarkar, Jagadish (1950). "Notes on Balasore and the English in the First Half of the Seventeenth Century". Proceedings of the Indian History Congress. 13: 209–219. JSTOR 44140917.
- Foster, William (1914). THE ENGLISH FACTORIESIN INDIA 1646— 1650 (PDF). Oxford.
- Knudsen, Karin (2017). "Kolonien Trankebar". Trankebar Foreningen.
