= Ambush near the Bay of Manila =

Ambush of Danish and Dutch sailors in the Philippines, 1645

- Part of the Conflict between Willem Leyel and Bernt Pessart
- Map of the Bay of Manila, 1886
Date	June 1645
Location	Unknown (presumable near the Bay of Manila, Philippines)
Result	Indigenous victory
Territorial changes	Dano-Dutch retreat

Belligerents
Danish India (Dutch East India Company) Dutch East Indies	Indigenous people

Commanders and leaders
(Danish India) Bernt Pessart † (Dutch East India Company) Unknown mate (WIA)	Unknown

Units involved
(Danish India) Dend gode Haab	Native archers

Strength
Some men	Unknown

Casualties and losses
1 dead 2 wounded	Negligible

The Ambush near the Bay of Manila (Danish; Angrebet nær Manilabugten), alternatively the Death of Bernt Pessart (Danish; Bernt Pessarts død), was an ambush by the Indigenous peoples of the Philippines, against a combined Dano-Dutch espionaging expeditionary force in 1645. The ambush led to the death of former governor and president of Danish India, Bernt Pessart.

== Background ==
Route of the expedition

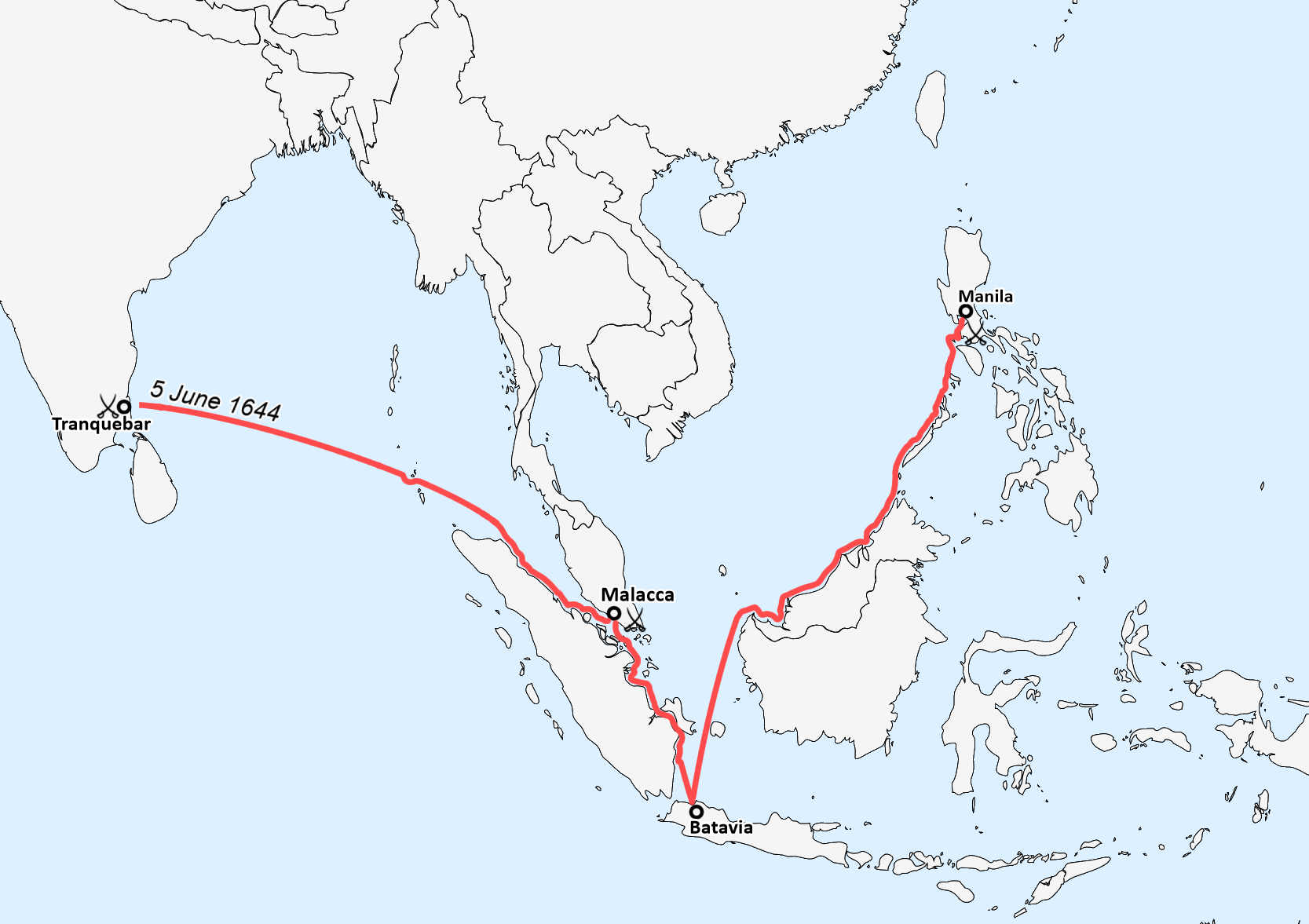
Route of Bernt Pessart's escape from Tranquebar (1644-1645)

Bernt Pessart's regime led to a financial crisis for the Danish East India Company. This damaged the Danish East Indian reputation to such a point that Christian IV of Denmark ordered the arrest of Pessart and sent Willem Leyel to Dansborg to succeed him.

When Pessart was notified of Leyel's arrival, he hastily bought a Portuguese sloop, which he renamed Dend Gode Haab (The Good Hope), and left for Japan. Though, Dend Gode Haab was intercepted by the Dutch at Malacca and, together with Pessart, brought to Batavia. Here Pessart received 10 men and new goods by the Dutch authorities, which then ordered him to espionage on the Spanish Philippines.

When they reached the Philippines Pessart's Dutch mate, had difficulties finding the Bay of Manila, and accidentally entered another nearby bay. Though in the hopes to find someone to direct them, they dropped anchor. Here they would stay for the next couple of days to gather fresh water, firewood and to repair their sails.

Map of the northern Philippines (Luzon)

== Ambush ==
They remained for a week; but on the seventh day Pessart went fishing with a boat and some of the men and caught three large fish. While preparing the fish, some natives came out of the nearby woods and shot at Pessart and his men. Pessart, the Dutch mate and a Sámi man, who had been in Pessart's service for a long time, were all shot. Pessart managed to get out to the boat, where he and the Sámi man were dragged up, while Pessart gasped: Help me up, or i am a dead man! The boat only had one oar, though they still managed to get out to ship, Dend Gode Haab. When Pessart got onboard on Dend Gode Haab he was already dead, and was subsequently buried on a small island nearby.

== Aftermath ==
Since the captain was dead, Michel Evertsen took command and decided to continue to Manila, where they would successfully sell their goods and gather information in the local fortifications. Though in Manila, one of Pessart's slaves broke out and informed the local commander about the espionage. In response, the Spanish administration would confiscate Dend Gode Haab and imprison its crew.

Afterwards the new governor of Tranquebar, Willem Leyel, would try to get the Danish seamen out of captivity, but seemingly without prevail.

== See also ==
- Cattle War – Conflict between Danish India and the Thanjavur Maratha kingdom
- Siege of Dansborg (1644) – Siege in Tranquebar, India 1644
- Willem Leyel's siege of Dansborg – Siege of Fort Dansborg, 1644
- Roland Crappé's raids on Portuguese colonies – Danish raids in India and Sri Lanka, 1619
- Assault on Osu – 1678 Attack on Osu between Akwamu and Accrans forces
