= Capture of the St. Michael =

1644 Danish capture of a Bengali ship

Capture of St. Michael
- Part of the Dano-Mughal War
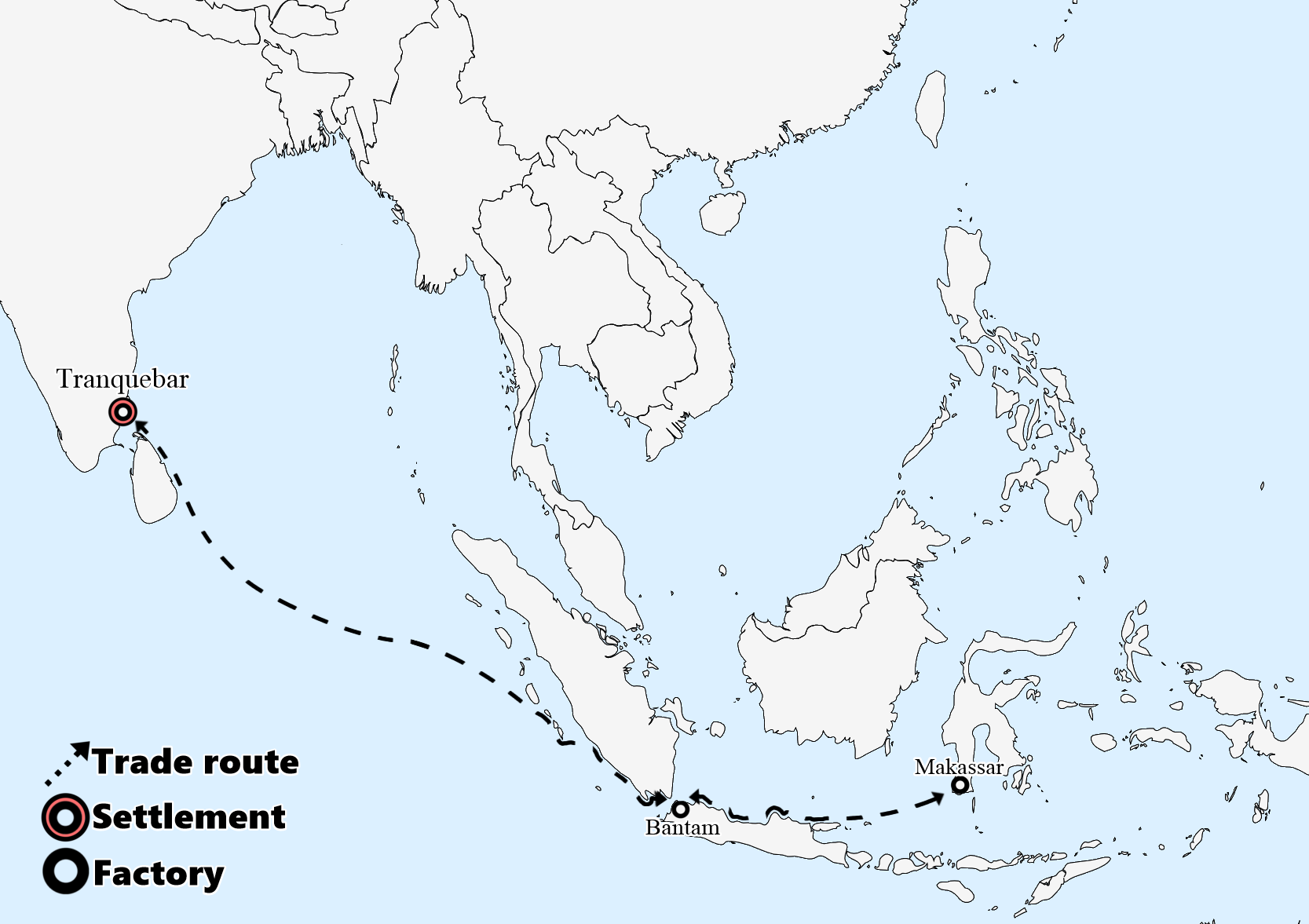
- Danish India at the time of the capture, 1643–1669
Date	29 September 1644
Location	Bay of Bengal
Result	Danish victory

Belligerents
Danish India	Bengal Subah

Commanders and leaders
(Danish India) Willem Leyel	Unknown nakoda

Units involved
(Danish India) Fortuna	St. Michael (Note: Name given to the vessel after its seizure)

Strength
1 ship	1 ship 1 boat

Casualties and losses
Unknown	1 ship captured

The Capture of St. Michael (Danish; Kapre af St. Michael) or the Seizure of St. Michael, was a Danish seizure of a Bengali ship in the Bay of Bengal. The Danes captured the Bengali ship and the vessel was subsequently incorporated into the Danish Navy given the name St. Michael.

== Background ==
In 1625 the Danish vessel, Jupiter was lost off the coast of Odisha in Bengal along with its men and goods, which resulted in the imprisonment of the captain and his crew by local Bengali authorities. Similar events happened to Nattergalen in 1626 and St. Jacob in 1640. Such considerable losses could not be tolerated by Danish India, and in 1642 governor Bernt Pessart declared war on the Mughal Empire to retaliate for their initial losses. Pessart was afterwards deposed, and Willem Leyel assumed office.

== Capture ==
Leyel resumed privateering against the Bengalis, when he put the vessel Fortuna at sea. At sea it confronted a Bengali ship, which was on its way home from the Maldive islands. On board were coconut fibre and Crownies, which in ancient time were used as jewellery and as local Indian currency. When the Bengali captain (a Nakoda) saw the Fortuna he figured that resistance was to be useless, and so he jumped into a boat with some ambergris and other goods and fled. The Bengali captain also took the sails, presumably in the hope that the Danes would have hardship to remove the ship.

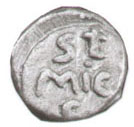
A coin with the inscription St MICA EL, which presumably refers to St Michael.

== Aftermath ==
Despite new sails the ship still sailed very slow, so Leyel sailed ahead to Emeldy, where he would wait a fortnight before the prize arrived. When arriving at Emeldy the prize was incorporated into the Dano-Norwegian Navy, and since it was seized on St. Michael's Day, it received the name St Michael.

=== St Michael in Danish service ===
During the rest of Leyel's regime St Michael would be one of four Danish ships that were active in the East Indies. In October 1644 St Michael was nearly wrecked in a storm. It lost both anchors and the crew were stranded on a coast near Narasapuram, though they managed to safe the ship by cutting the mainmast. In February 1645 it was sent to a Dutch shipyard at Cotiari to be repaired, and later in 1645 it would set sail for Queda (Kedah) on the basis of trade.

== See also ==
- Tillali Massacre – 1756 Massacre of Europeans in India
- Dannemarksnagore
- Bengal Subah – Subdivision of the Mughal Empire between 1576 and 1717
- Cattle War – Conflict between Danish India and the Thanjavur Maratha kingdom
- Loss of the St. Jacob – 1640 grounding of a Danish ship
- Grounding of the Jupiter – 1625 grounding of a Danish ship

== Works cited ==
- Wellen, Kathryn (2015). The Danish East India Company's War against the Mughal Empire, 1642-1698 (PDF). Royal Netherlands Institute for Southeast Asian and Caribbean Studies.
- Bredsdorff, Asta (2009). The Trials and Travels of Willem Leyel. Copenhagen: Museum Tusculanum Press. ISBN 9788763530231.
- Bredsdorff, Asta (1999). Søhistoriske Skrifter (PDF) (in Danish). Vol. XXI. Copenhagen: Handels- og Søfartsmuseet Kronborg.
- Leyel, Willem (1644). Rentekammerafdelingen: Willum Leyels arkiv (1639 - 1648) (in Danish). Danske Kancelli.
- Bonefeld, Olav (1977). SKIBSNAVNE PÅ BLYMØNTER FRA TRANKEBAR (in Danish). pp. 109–127.
- Sejerøe, Olav (1996). "Skibsnavne på Trankebarmønter". Danskmoent.
- Knudsen, Karin (2017). "Kolonien Trankebar". Trankebar Foreningen.
