= Willem Leyel's siege of Dansborg =

Siege of Fort Dansborg, 1644

- Part of Conflict between Willem Leyel and Bernt Pessart
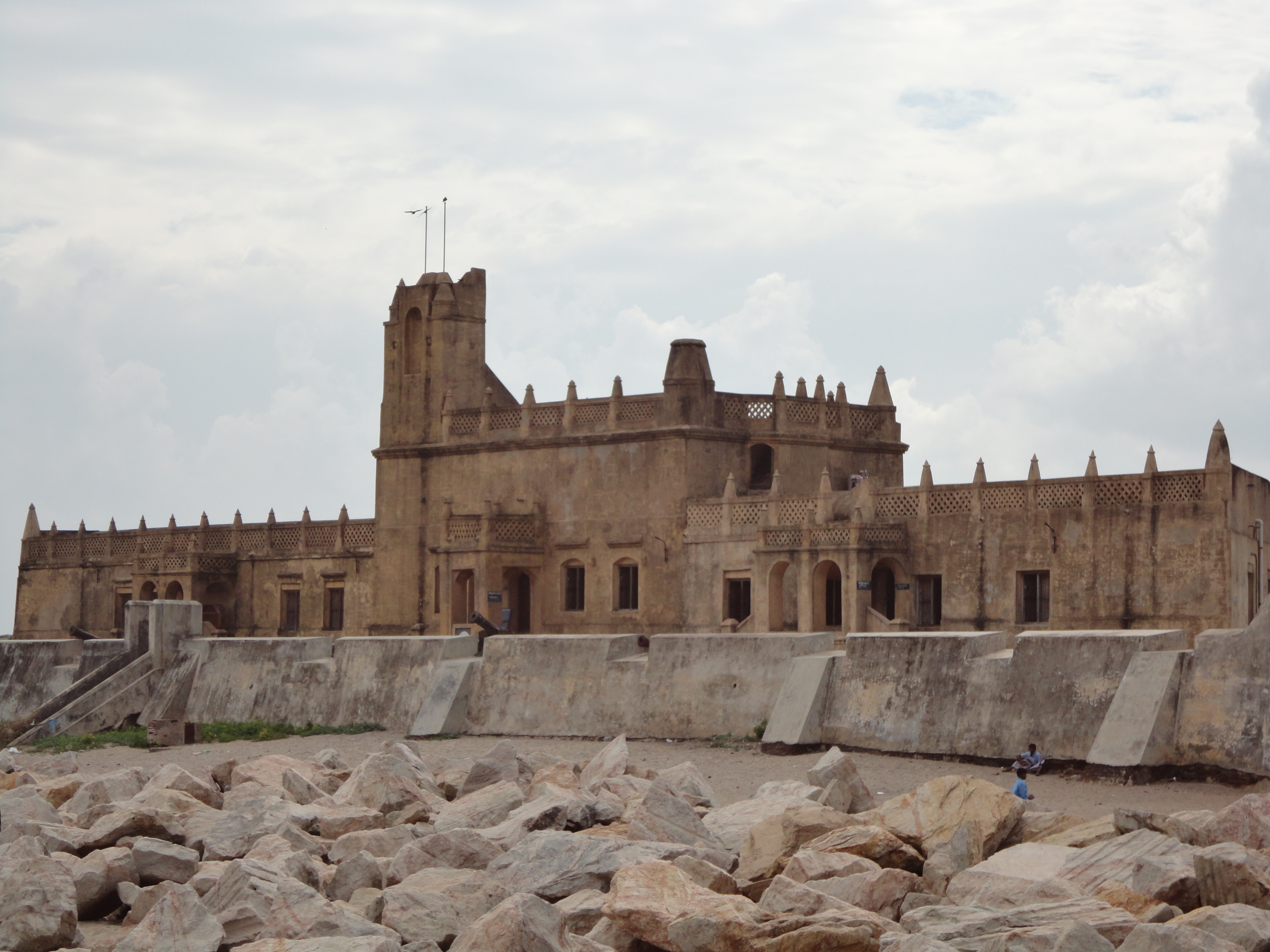
- Modern-day picture of Fort Dansborg, India
| Date | 22 June 1644 – ? 1644 |
| Location | Fort Dansborg, Tranquebar 11.03°N 79.84°E |
| Result | Leyel victory |

Belligerents
| Danish India | (Danish India) Leyel loyalist (Portuguese Empire) Portuguese Carical; Supported by: Thanjavur Nayak; Tranquebar |

Commanders and leaders
| (Danish India) Bernt Pessart (Danish India) Jacob Stackenborg (Danish India) Niels Andersen (Danish India) Frantz Erkmand (surrendered) | (Danish India) Willem Leyel (Portuguese Empire) Antonio Pacheco Vijaya Raghava Nayak |

Units involved
| Unknown | (Danish India) Christianshavn |

Strength
| 35 men | 70 men |

Casualties and losses
| Unknown | Unknown |

The siege of Dansborg (Danish; belejringen af Dansborg) alternatively the siege of Fort Dansborg (Danish; belejringen af Fort Dansborg) sometimes also referred to as Willem Leyel's siege of Dansborg (Danish; William Leyels belejring af Dansborg), was a siege initiated by traveler and seafarer, Willem (Danish; William) Leyel, against the men loyal to governor Bernt Pessart. The siege was concluded after the men at Dansborg opened the gates for Willem Leyel, surrendered, and accepted Leyel as the new governor.

== Background ==
Christian IV

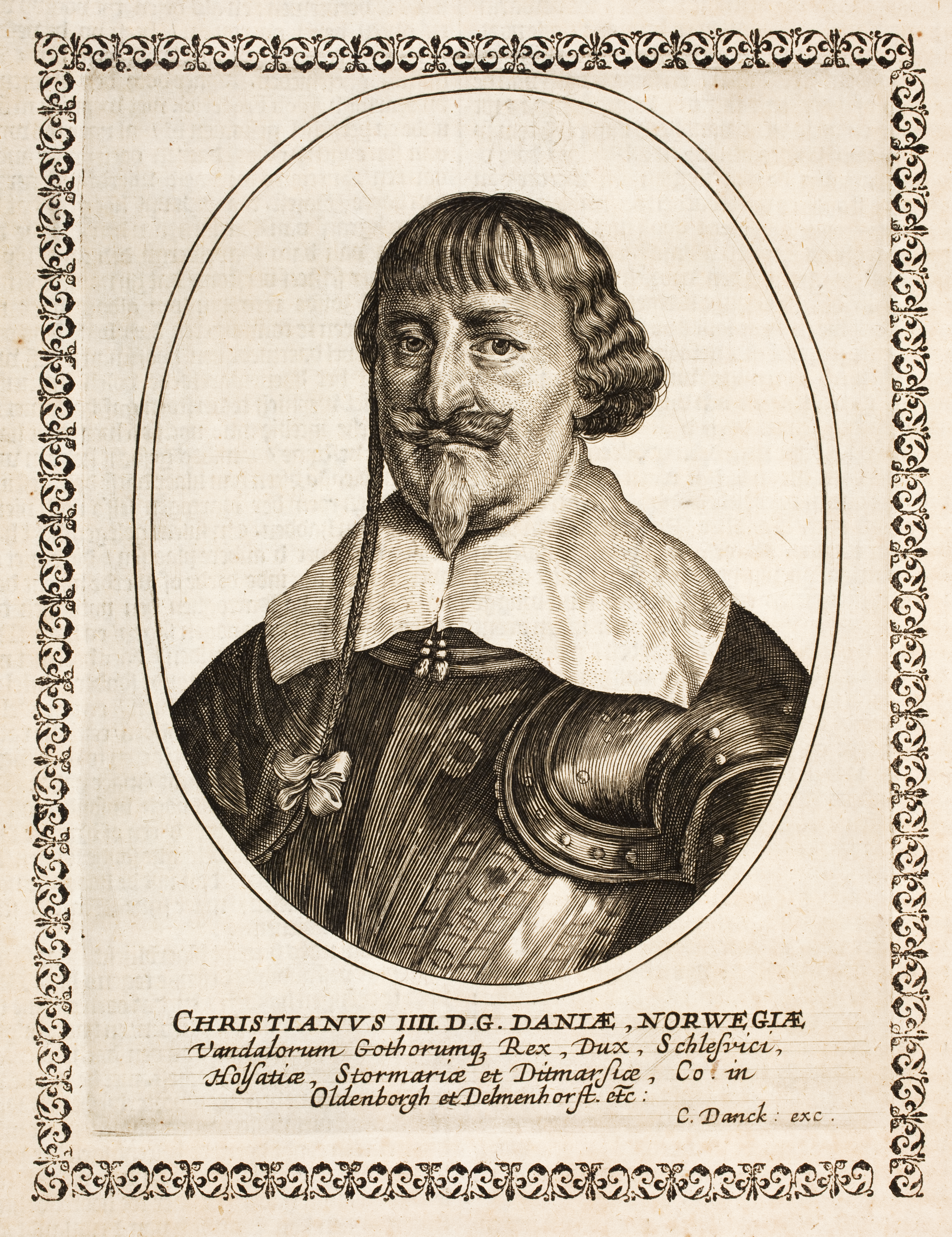
Engraving of Christian IV of Denmark, by Matthäus Merian

In 1620, on a voyage from Denmark to India, Ove Gjedde established Danish India at Tranquebar. His successor, Dutchman Ronald Crappé went further and established a far-flung string of Danish factories in Asia. These foundations were, though, not maintained by his successor, Bernt Pessart (admin. 1636-1643) who encumbered large debts from the start of his administration. Because of the economic failures, the largest investor in the company, king Christian IV of Denmark, sought to reestablish the economic success and therefore sent out experienced seafarer, Willem Leyel, to Tranquebar.

=== Arrival of Leyel ===
Leyel went ashore at Tranquebar on 22 June 1644, with 70 armed men, both "blacks and "whites", and two smaller guns. Concurrently, governor Bernt Pessart had left for Japan and left the fort in control of Jakob von Stackenborg. Stackenborg sealed off Dansborg for Leyel, and subsequently, Leyel now initiated a siege on the fortress.

== Siege ==
Leyel was well-received by the local inhabitants of Tranquebar, who had suffered under Pessart’s rule, and now came with food and water to assist the besiegers. The local adrigar at once offered to assist Leyel with his own men. Leyel's army camped behind a stone powder magazine about two musket shots from Dansborg. The siege lasted for some time. The Thanjavurians, who were eager to get rid of Pessart and his governorship, now helped Leyel and his men by feeding them.

== Negotiations ==
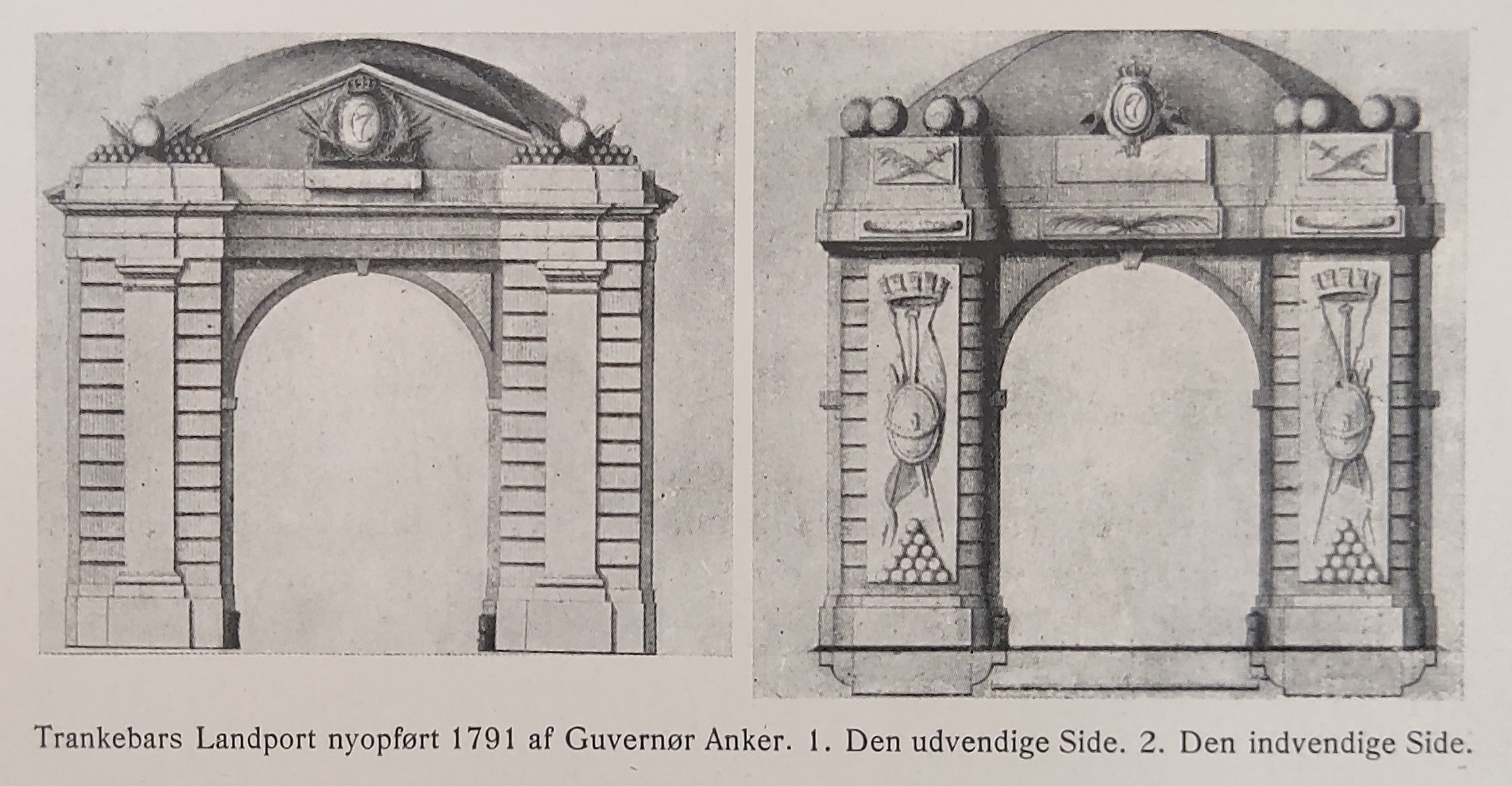
Fort entrance of Fort Dansborg, Tranquebar

After some time, the commander of the guard, Frantz Erkmand, with some other men from Dansborg, came out and admitted that there was a shortage of nearly everything in Dansborg. Leyel now showed Erkmand the king's orders, upon which Erkmand promised, on behalf of the garrison, that they would surrender and recognize Leyel as their governor if Leyel promised to pardon them on behalf of the king. Leyel could not afford to lose more men on Tranquebar, and thus willingly accepted the demands.

== Aftermath ==
The gates of Dansborg were now opened for Leyel and his men. Yet to his demise, there was not much left but the naked walls. Leyel initiated a closer inspection of Dansborg’s buildings and fortifications. There did not seem to be a whole door or window frame in all of the fortifications, and everything was in bad shape. Leyel would, despite setbacks, still try to reestablish the trade and prestige of the Danish East India Company, which had been lost to his predecessor.

== See also ==
- Tillali Massacre – 1756 Massacre of Europeans in India
- Dannemarksnagore
- Thanjavur Maratha kingdom – Principality in Southern India
- Cattle War – Conflict between Danish India and the Thanjavur Maratha kingdom
- Siege of Dansborg (1644) – Siege in Tranquebar, India 1644
- Dano-Mughal War – Danish colonial conflict against the Mughal Empire
