= Skirmish at the Strait of Malacca =

Skirmish between Danes and Dutch in Malacca, 1644

- Part of the Conflict between Willem Leyel and Bernt Pessart
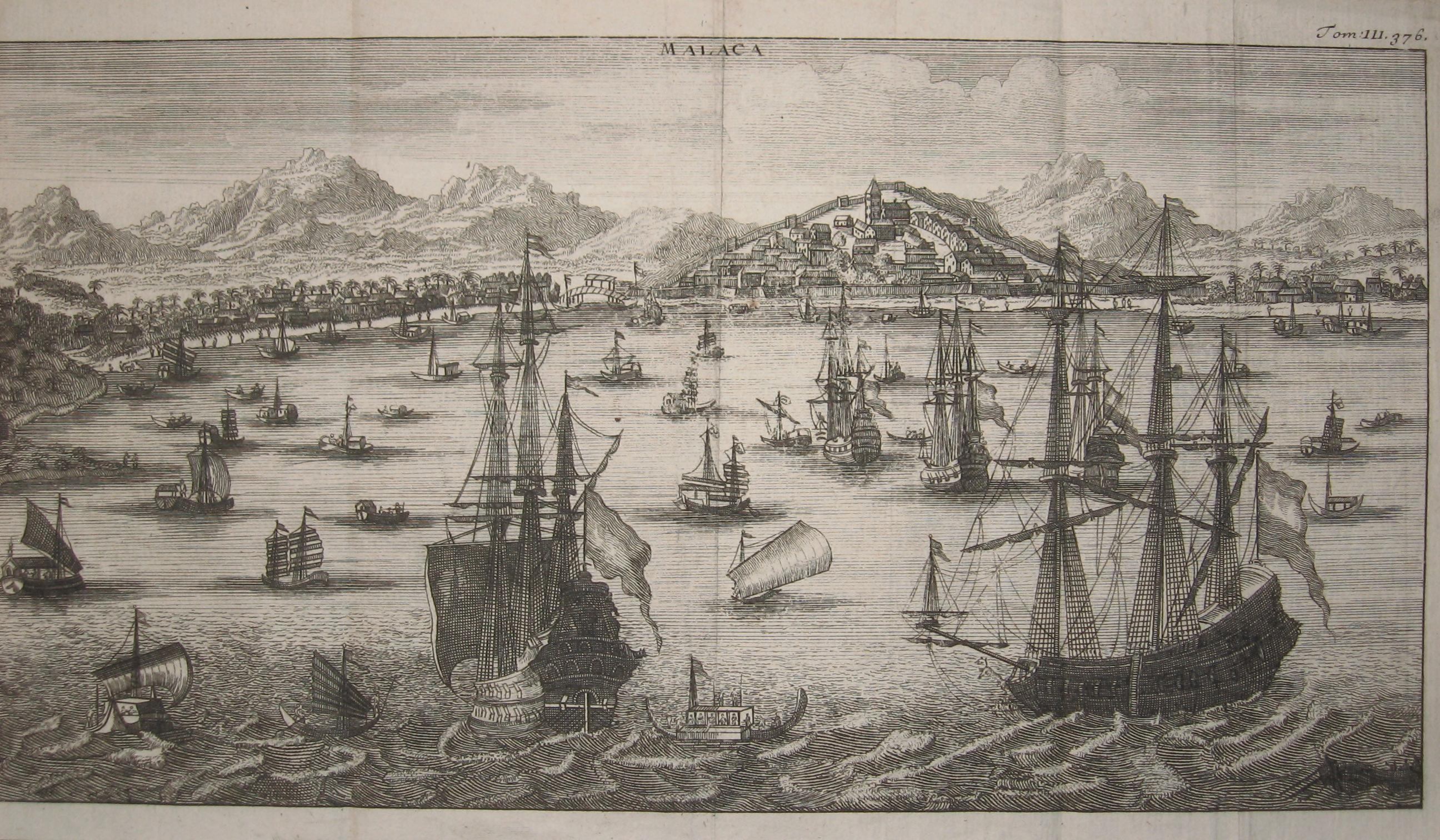
- Dutch Ships in Malacca Harbor, by Wouter Schouten
Date	1644
Location	Strait of Malacca 4°N 100°E
Result	Dutch victory

Belligerents
(Dutch East India Company) Dutch Malacca	Danish India

Commanders and leaders
(Dutch East India Company) Unknown mate (WIA)	(Danish India) Bernt Pessart (POW) (Danish India) Michel Evertsen (Danish India) Peter Sivart †

Units involved
Unknown	(Danish India) Dend gode Haab

Strength
1 boat	1 ship

Casualties and losses
Unknown	36 imprisoned

The Skirmish at the Strait of Malacca (Danish; Træfningen ved Malakkastrædet) was a skirmish in 1644 between the claimed governor of Tranquebar, Bernt Pessart, and the local authorities of Dutch Malacca. The confrontation led to the imprisonment or death of all of Pessart's crew and the confiscation of the vessel, Dend gode Haab. Although Pessart and his crew would later be released and cooperate with the Dutch to spy on the Spanish in Manila.

== Background ==
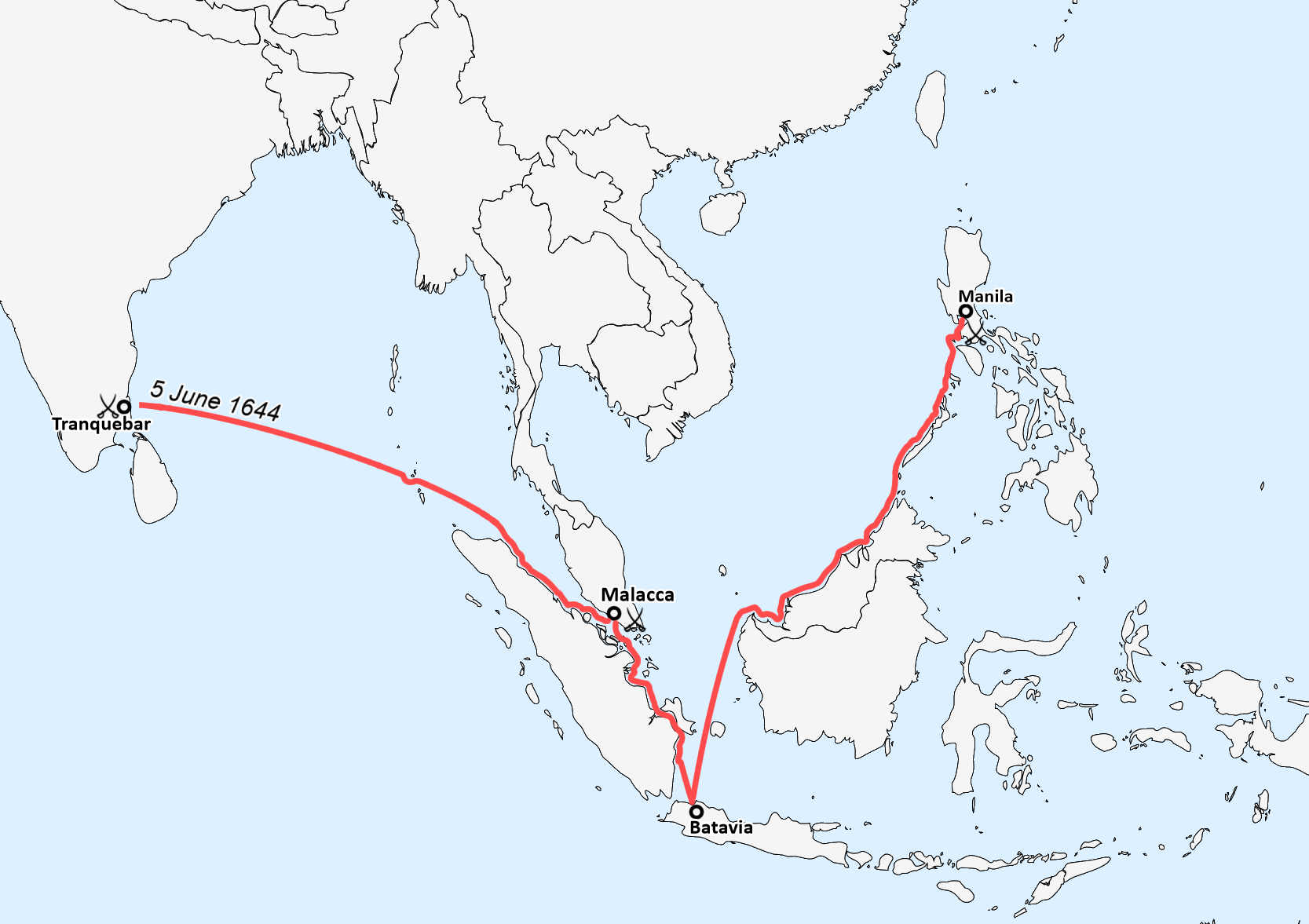
Escape route of Bernt Pessart (1644-1645)

Bernt Pessart's regime had greatly damaged Danish East Indian commerce, and as a response Willem Leyel was sent from Copenhagen to Dansborg to arrest Pessart. Pessart had gotten the news of his ordered arrest, and imprisoned the messenger. When Pessart's spies had informed him about Willem's arrival, he hastily bought a Portuguese vessel, which he named Dend gode Haab (The Good Hope), and left for Japan.

Pessart sailed east in order to pass through the Strait of Malacca on his way to Japan, yet the Dutch had seized Malacca from the Portuguese in 1641, and sharply regulated the bypassing ships in order to preserve their spice monopoly. When Pessart entered the Straits, the heavy wind stopped and they thereafter lay becalmed near Malacca.

== Skirmish ==
While the ship lay becalm, the crew spend their time drinking, meanwhile a Dutch mate from a nearby ship came over to inspect to ship. The mate was invited to share their drink, though, the drunk Danes quickly started an argument with the mate, and Danish Michel Evertsen came in fight with the Dutchman. The Dutch mate escaped with torn clothes and a number of wounds.

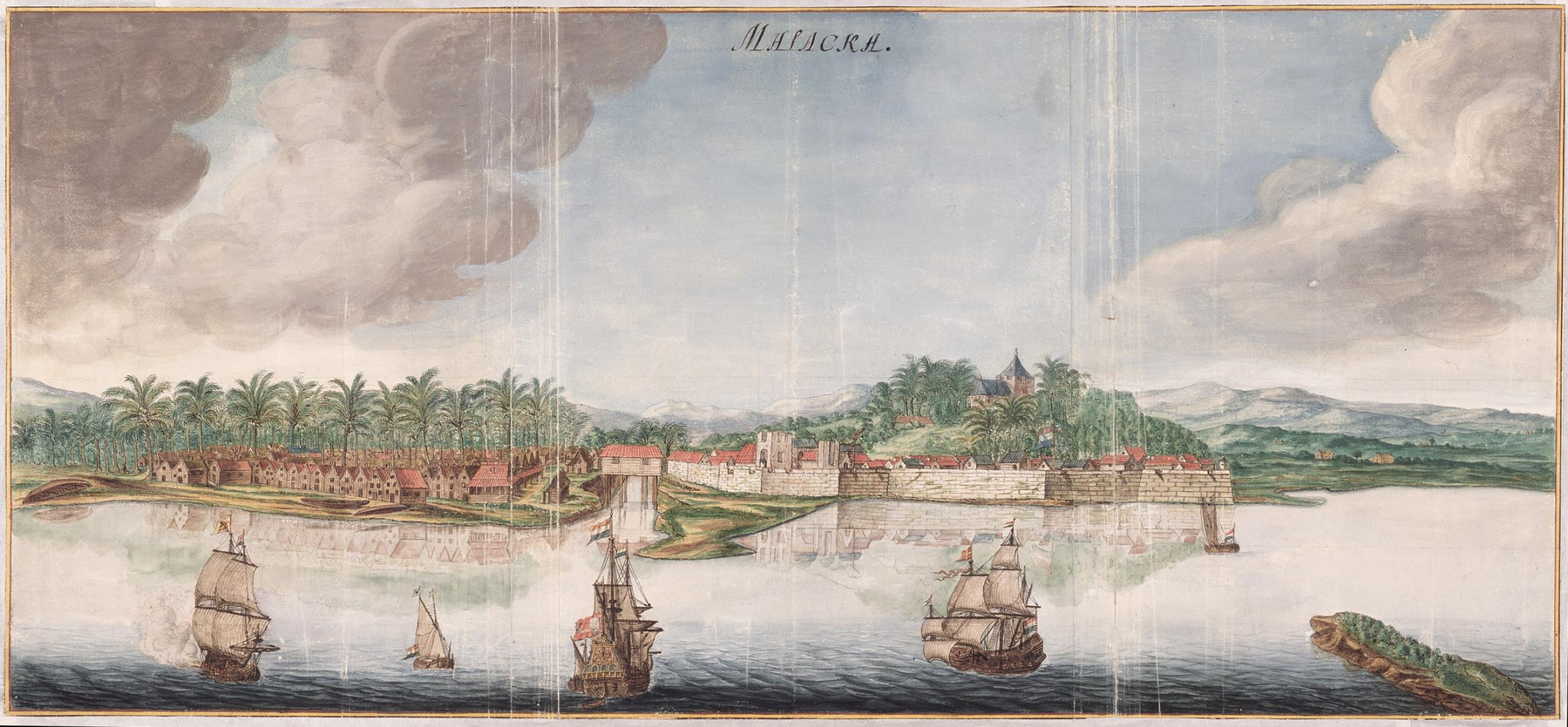
Map of the city of Malacca, 1665

=== Action ===
When the wounded mate returned to his own ship, the officers deemed this treatment unacceptable, and sent a boat of full armed men to Dend gode Haab. The Drunkened Danes tried to defend themselves, yet could hardly stand upright. Pessart was wounded in the foot by a spear, and he and his crew was put in prison.

It is unknown how many casualties there were, yet we are informed that the vessel, Christianshavn's former mate, Peter de Sivart, and several others died on the way to Batavia, and it is likely that it was here.

== Aftermath ==
The surviving Danes imprisoned, and Dend gode Haab was confiscated and brought to Malacca City. Pessart and his crew remained in prison for three months, though Pessart heavily protested for his release and the Dutch authorities finally gave in and sent Pessart, his crew and Dend gode Haab to Batavia, where a case on the matter would be brought before the local court.

After six further months of imprisonment in Batavia, Pessart's ship was given back, though with a new mission to (instead of going to Japan) espionage on Spanish Philippines.

== See also ==
- Siege of Malacca (1641) – Dutch siege against Portugal in Malaysia
- Johor Sultanate – Sultanate of Johor
- Cattle War – Conflict between Danish India and the Thanjavur Maratha kingdom
- Siege of Dansborg (1644) – Siege in Tranquebar, India 1644
- Willem Leyel's siege of Dansborg – Siege of Fort Dansborg, 1644
- Dano-Mughal War – Danish colonial conflict against the Mughal Empire
