= Land district =

Administrative division of some countries

A land district is a type of administrative division in some countries.

== Australia ==
The lands administrative divisions of New South Wales refers to the 141 counties within the Colony of New South Wales, that later became the Australian state of New South Wales.

- Lands administrative divisions of New South Wales#Land divisions.2C boards and districts

== Canada ==
Land districts are the cadastral system underlying land titles in the province, and used by the provincial gazetteer in descriptions of landforms, administrative areas, and other information. Those on Vancouver Island were established via a Lands Act of the government of the Colony of Vancouver Island, from 1843 onwards; those on the Mainland were established by the Lands Act of 1860 by the Colony of British Columbia.

- List of land districts of British Columbia

== New Zealand ==
The land districts of New Zealand are the cadastral divisions of New Zealand, which are used on property titles. There are 12 districts, six in the North Island and six in the South Island. The land districts are similar to, but different from, the 16 local government regions. The current legislation for the land districts is the Land Transfer Act 1952.

- Land Districts of New Zealand
