= Conflict between Willem Leyel and Bernt Pessart =

Conflict and Danish civil war in India, between 1643–1645

Conflict between William Leyel and Bernt Pessart
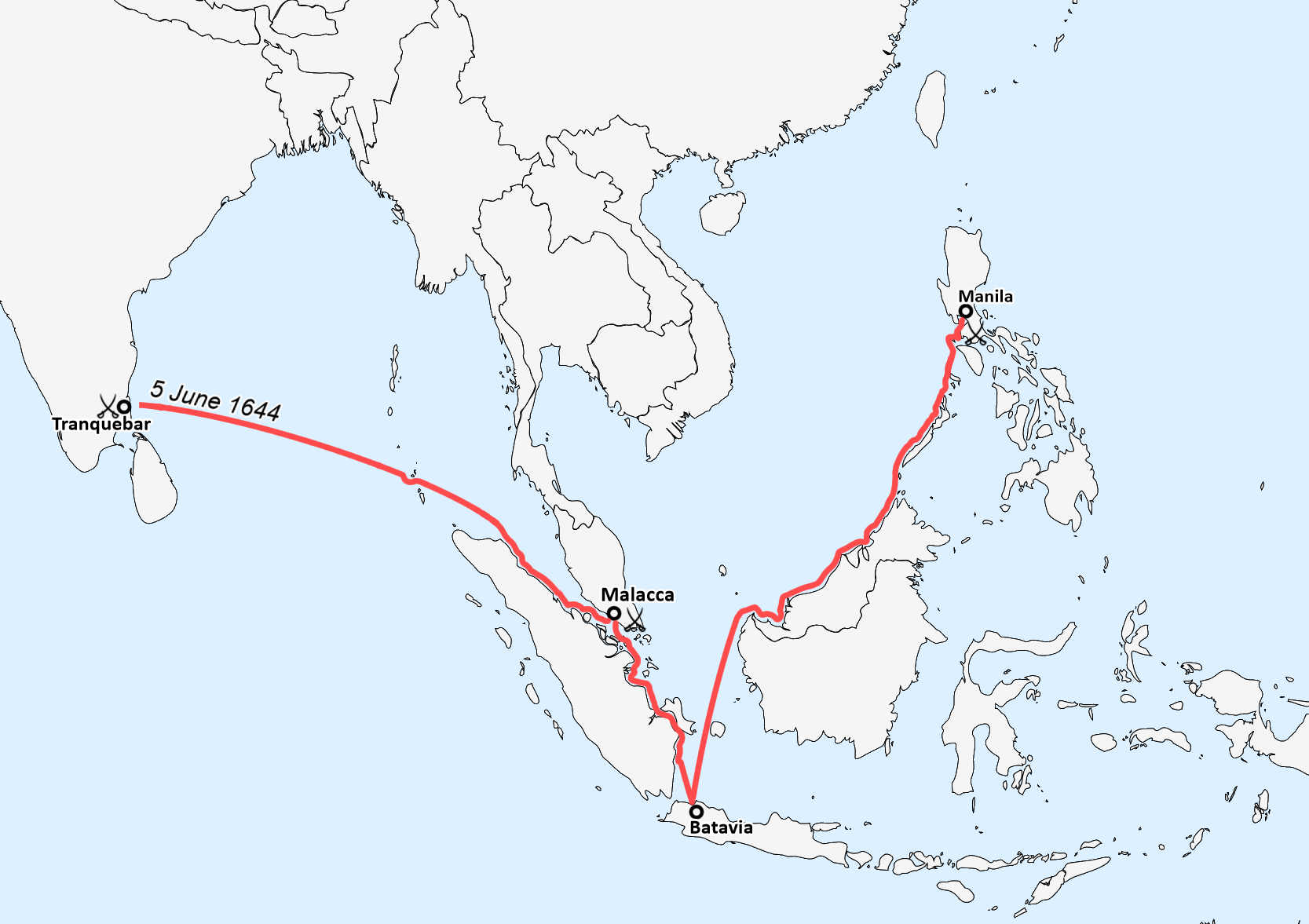
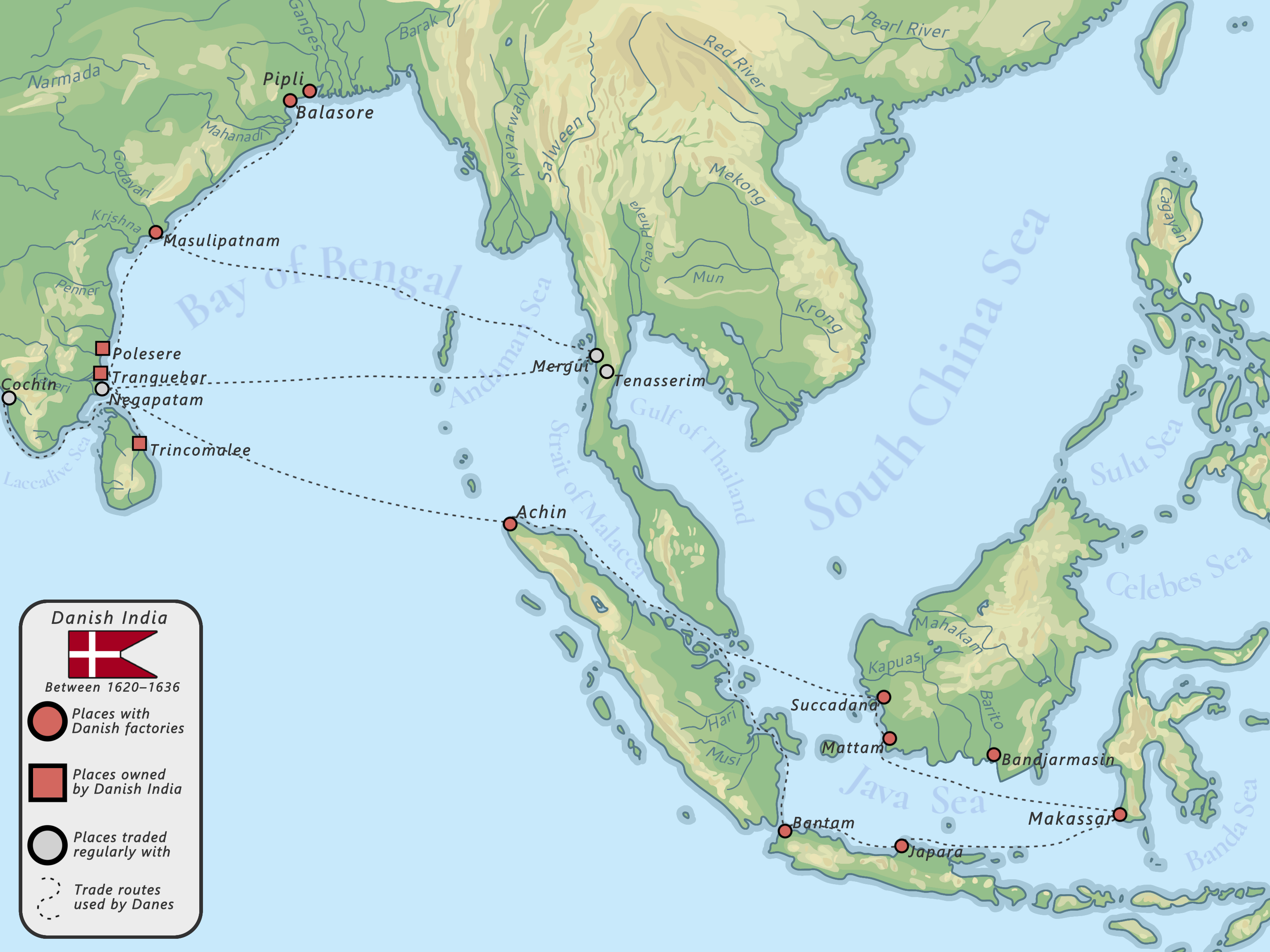
- Top: Bernt Pessart's expedition, 1644–1645; Bottom: Danish India, 1622–1636
Date	1643–1645
Location	Indian Ocean
Result	Leyel victory
Territorial changes	All of Danish India accepts Willem Leyel as governor

Belligerents
(Danish India) Pessart loyalist	Leyel loyalist (Dutch East India Company) Dutch Coromandel; English Madras (Portuguese Empire) Portuguese Carical; Supported by: Thanjavur Nayak

Commanders and leaders
(Danish India) Bernt Pessart † (Danish India) Jacob Stackenborg (Danish India) Niels Andersen (Danish India) Frantz Erkmand (surrendered) (Danish India) Michel Evertsen (Danish India) Peter de Sivart (Danish India) Marten Jansen	Willem Leyel; Claus Rytter; Herman Clausen; Jørgen Hansen (Dutch East India Company) Anthony Diemen; Francis Day (Portuguese Empire) Antonio Pacheco Vijaya Raghava Nayak

Units involved
(Danish India) Dend gode Haab (Danish India) Dansborg garrison (Danish India) Den store Charluppe	Valby; Christianshavn; Christian

Strength
~51; 1 ship 1 barge Multiple guns	70 men 3 ships 1 longboat 3 guns

Casualties and losses
1 ship Unknown amount of men 36 imprisoned	Negligible

The Conflict between William Leyel and Bernt Pessart (Danish; Conflikten mellem Leyel og Pessart) refers to the tensions and minor civil war between Willem Leyel and Bernt Pessart over the governorship of Tranquebar and the Danish East India Company. The conflict led to the escape of Bernt Pessart, and the command at Tranquebar accepted Willem Leyel as governor of Danish India.

== Background ==
During the Age of Exploration various European nations sought to establish themselves in the Indian subcontinent to expand commerce and trade. Christian IV of Denmark (r 1588–1648) sought to expand Denmark's international presence and economy and subsequently established the Danish East India Company in 1616. In 1618, on the basis of an un-ratified treaty with Senarat of Kandy, Ove Gjedde was sent to India to establish a monopol on Ceylon.

Senerat did no longer desire the Danish monopol when Gjedde arrived. Instead Gjedde succeeded in signing a treaty with the nayak of the Thanjavurian kingdom, which by an annual tribute gave the Danes the right to the small fishing village of Tharangambadi.

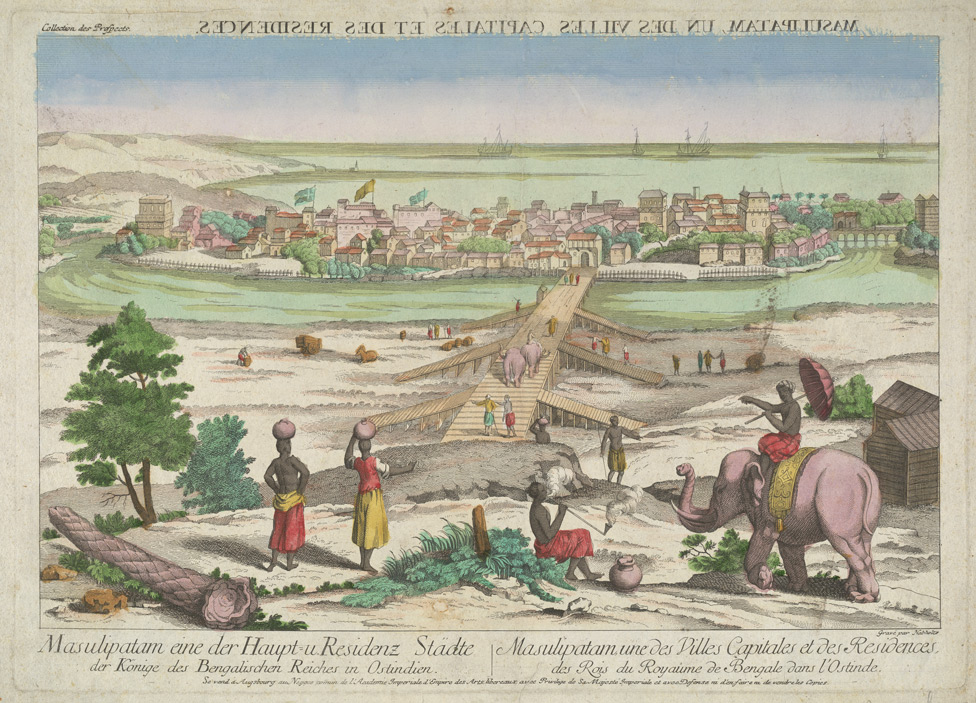
View of Masulipatam (Bandar), 1676. Roland Crappé made Bandar the centre for the company's trade, and Bernt Pessart further made it the official headquarters.

During the 1620s and 30's trade flourished, and a far-flung string of Danish factories and outposts were established in Bengal, the Coromandel Coast and Sunda Islands. Though in the late 1630s and early 40's the company would start to owe large debts, and in response governor Bernt Pessart unsuccessfully made numerous risky voyages to make money. Pessart would ignore the Danish company's most profitable contacts such as Tanjore and Makassar, and even Tranquebar which fell into chaos. Pessart would, in favour of Tranquebar, reside in Bandar which were the center of trade in plain cotton goods. Here Pessart would become involved in diamond trade.

== Prelude ==
Because of the situation in India, Christian IV sent captain Willem Leyel to Dansborg to investigate the company's affairs. Leyel arrived on 5 September 1643 in Dansborg. Here he fulfilled his royal orders and investigated Tranquebar; He noticed heavy damage to Fort Dansborg and found the warehouse empty. Pessart explained that Danborg was no longer of much use, and that the warehouse was emptied to load off two ships that were sent to the Sunda Islands.

When Pessart informed Leyel that he was going to Bandar, Leyel opted to join because he distrusted Pessart's intentions. When leaving Tranquebar, distrusted Leyel put a couple of men loyal to him on each of Pessart's ships and left others at Dansborg.

=== Joint voyage to Bandar ===
When at sea Pessart insisted to visit the English station at Madras, where he had accounts to settle with Francis Day. Here they stayed in four days, until Leyel got impatient and gave orders to sail. When Pessart heard they were about to weight anchor he was obligated to get on board, yet was furious at Leyel's decision. On 25 September they reached Bandar, Leyel was pained to hear about the debts and credits of the Danish Company in the town. Leyel and Pessart then continued to Emeldy. Here on 10 October Pessart tried to get the vessel, The Bengali Prize nearer to shore so it could unload, yet it ran aground and was badly damaged. Pessart carelessly put up a tent and began to drink

Sea campaigns

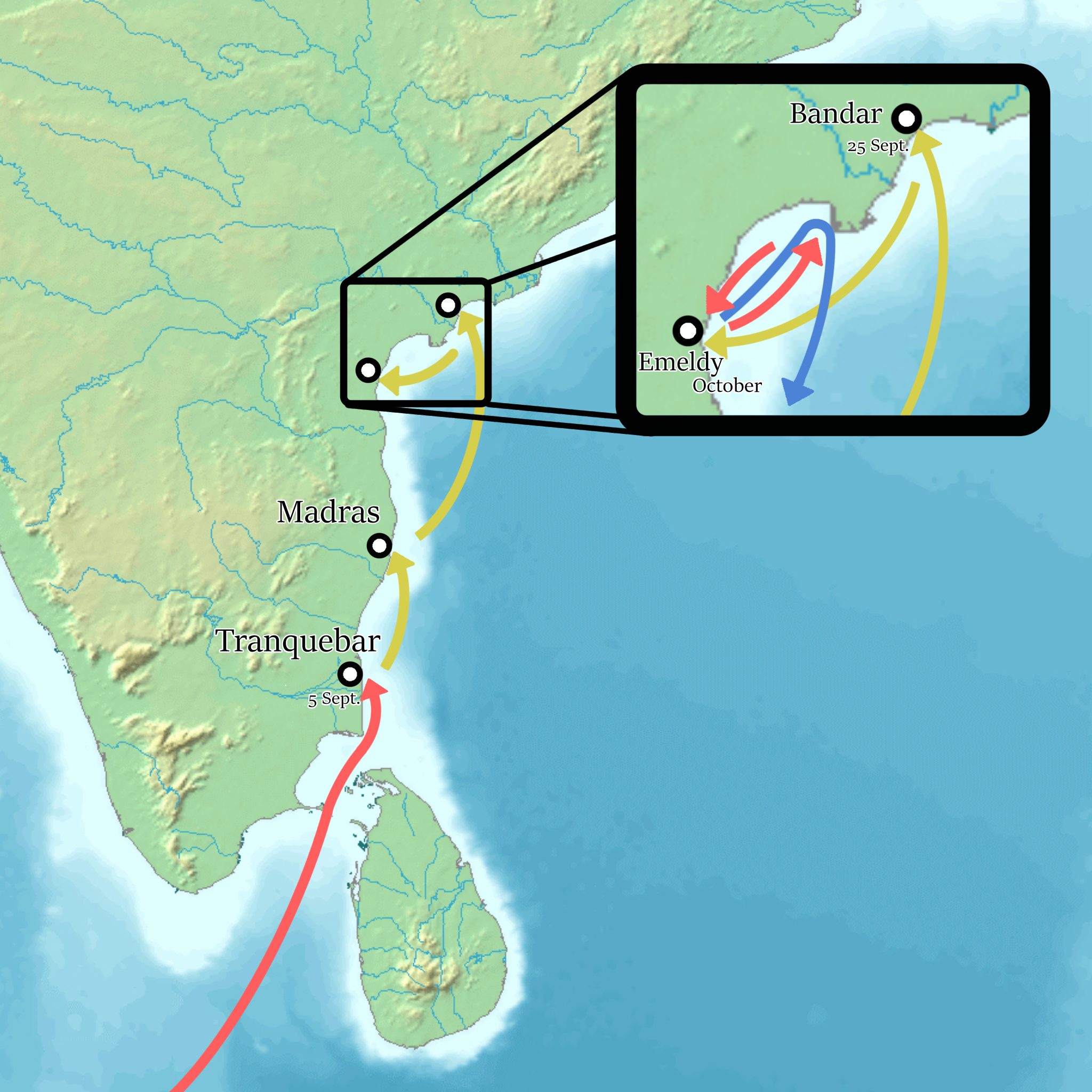
September–October, 1643

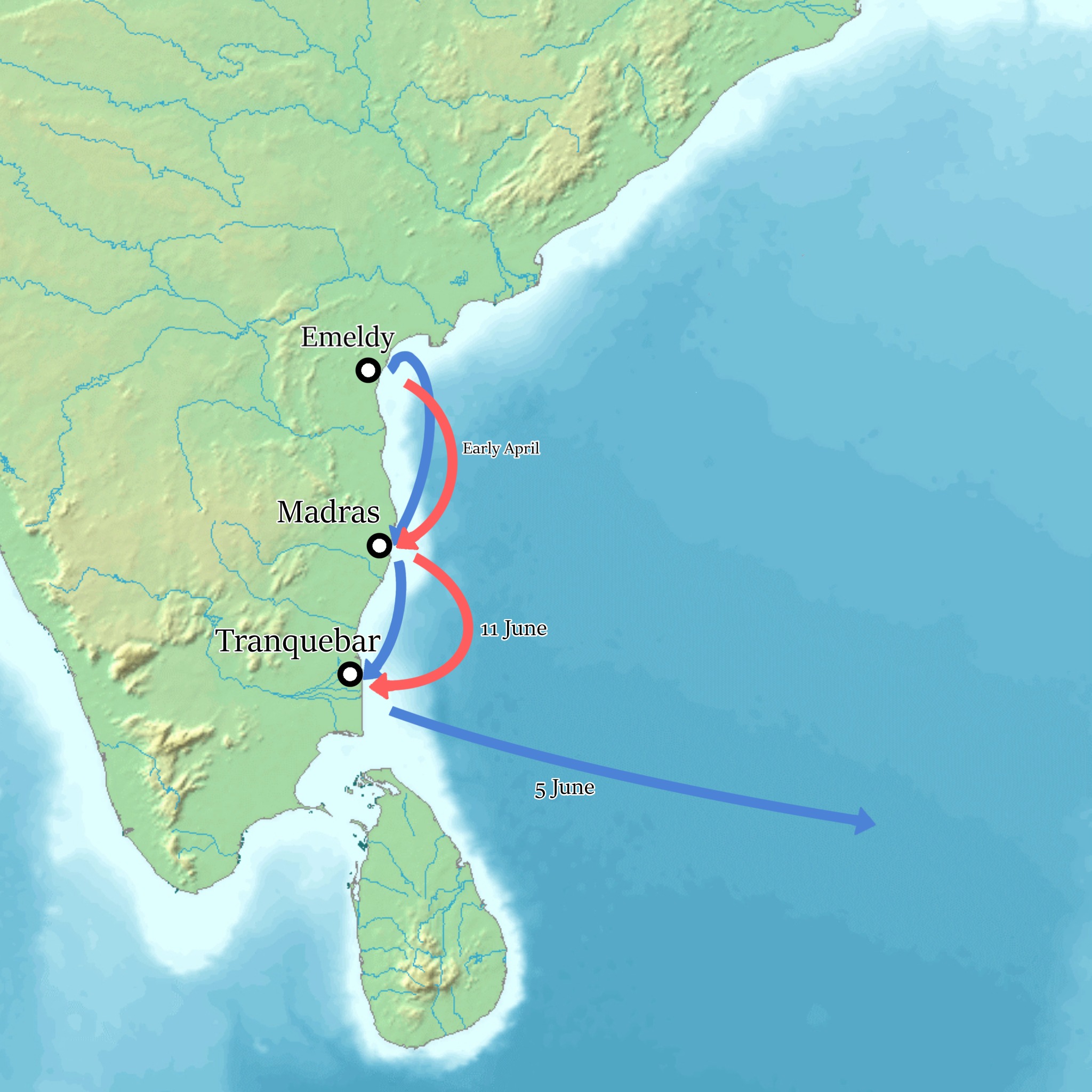
April–June, 1644
Routes of Willem Leyel
Routes of Bernt Pessart
Joint routes

== Conflict ==
One night several men secretly came to Leyel and told him that Pessart was planning to take Valby and sail off with his men. In response on 28 October Leyel sent Jørgen Hansen with eight unarmed men over to Valby where they went on board and cut the cable. This move was a minor risk; If Pessart had found out what was happening, he might have came out of his tent with his 20 armed men and a fight might have occurred, which Leyel wished to avoid.

With the intent to arrest Pessart, Leyel went ashore and advanced on Pessart's tent with a party of armed men. Yet when they entered the tent, they found out that Pessart had already fled with 16 men. Leyel found out, that Pessart not only had intentions to seize Valby but also to set Leyel's ship, Christianshavn, on fire.

=== Chase of Pessart ===
Leyel immediately sent off Jørgen Hansen with a longboat and a strongly armed crew to try overtake Pessart's barge. Hansen did overtake Pessart during the night and shouted to Pessart that he must return and declare his arrest, to which Pessart shouted that he would rather die. Hansen now gave orders to fire on Pessart's barge, yet the heavy sea made it hard to aim properly. Hansen pursued Pessart all the way to the Pedapulivarru reef, where he would give up because of Pessart's readiness to fight. Pessart would continue down to Dansborg.

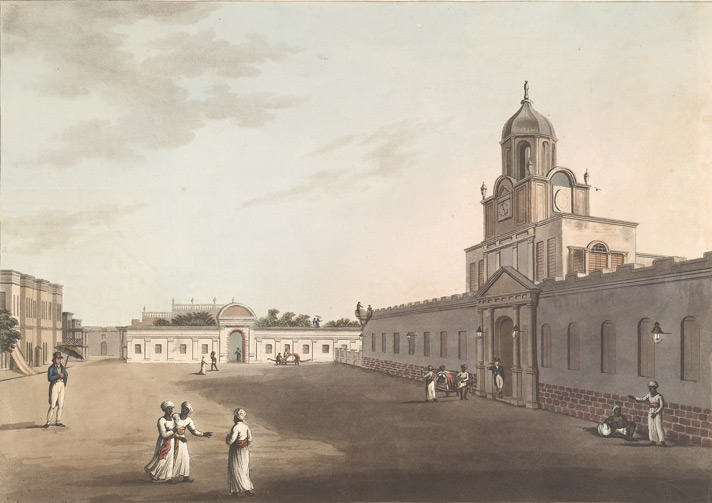
Fort St. George, Madras, by William Orme

Leyel and his men would stay at Emeldy during monsoon, while Pessart would reach the Santhome and later Dansborg. Leyel reached Fort St. George in early April and received a warm reception by Francis Day.Fort St. George. On June 11, 1644, Leyel, with Christianshavn and Valby, reached Dansborg, yet the city showed no sign of life. Unsure of the situation, Leyel sent letters to the commander at Dansborg, Jacob von Stackenborg, and chaplain, Niels Andersen with no response. Leyel suspected that Pessart had ordered to close to fort to Leyel and his men, and therefore Leyel wrote in one of his letters:

You may be sure that i will use even the most extreme measures, as is meet and proper, and to perform which i shall not lack the means ... To punish rebels and perjurers, as both the Dutch and the English have promised me every assistance; still, i hope that it will not prove necessary to resort to such extreme measures.

— Willem Leyel

After some time Leyel was still denied access to Tranquebar, and was therefore in need of fresh provisions, so he left for Karaikal, where he would send Portuguese Antonio Pacheco to Dansborg for negotiations. Pacheco was not well received in Dansborg, and when Leyel again anchored near Dansborg, Pacheco would successfully try to sail out to him, though under fire from Dansborg.

=== Siege of Dansborg ===
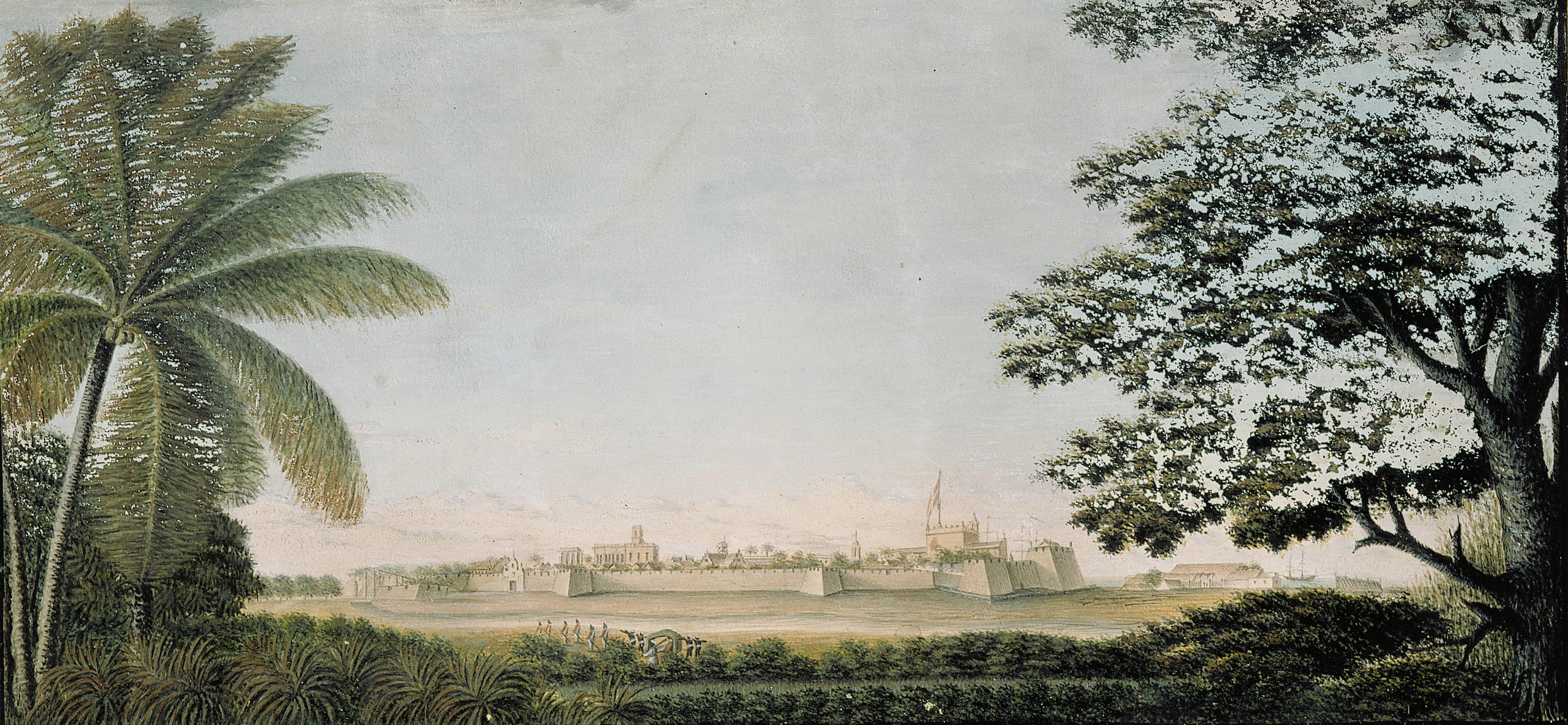
View of Tranquebar and its fortifications, 1790, by Peter Anker

Since Dansborg was still seald off, Leyel went ashore on June 22 with 70 armed men and two guns. He was received well by the local inhabitants and the Thanjavur Nayak kingdom, who feed his soldiers and offered to help. The siege lasted for some time. Finally the commander, Frantz Erkmand came out and admitted that there now was a shortage of almost everything in Dansborg. Erkmand would surrender on the terms that he would be pardoned, which Leyel accepted.

Leyel now inspected the town and fort to which he concluded that it had been left by Pessart in poor conditions. As response to the poor conditions and

Danish India 1643-1669

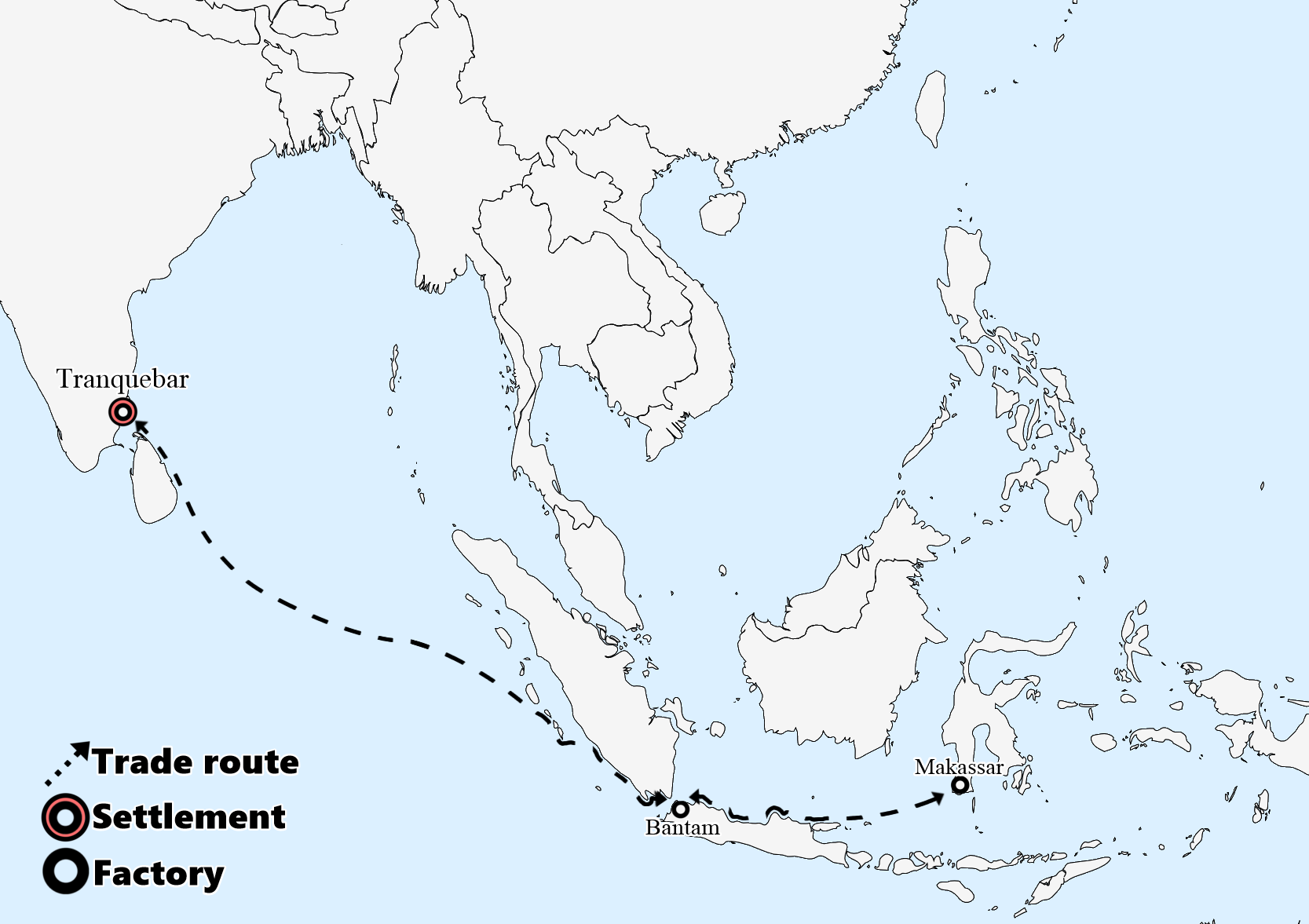
Danish settlements, factories and trading routes in India during Wilem Leyel's regime.

conflict with Pessart, he summoned a coincil meeting which ended in the recognition of Leyel as the new governor.

== Aftermath ==
Meanwhile, Pessart had left for Japan, though he was intercepted by the Dutch of the Malacca Strait. Pessart would be imprisoned for 6 month, after which he would be sent on a joint Dano-Dutch expedition to the Spanish Philippines. When Leyel got word of this, he quickly notified the Spanish governor. Though this would be unnecessary, since Pessart would be killed by a native Filipino near the Bay of Manila.

Leyel would now focus on the damages left by Pessart on the Danish Company. He would send annual voyages to the Danish outposts in Bantam and Makassar, and would actively privateer against the Mughal Empire.

== See also ==
- Cattle War – Conflict between Danish India and the Thanjavur Maratha kingdom
- Ove Gjedde – Danish nobleman and Admiral of the Realm
- Masulipatnam
- Conquest of Koneswaram Temple – Destruction and desecration of Koneswaram Temple
- Dano-Mughal War – Danish colonial conflict against the Mughal Empire
