= Tillali Massacre =

1756 Massacre of Europeans in India

- Part of the Cattle War
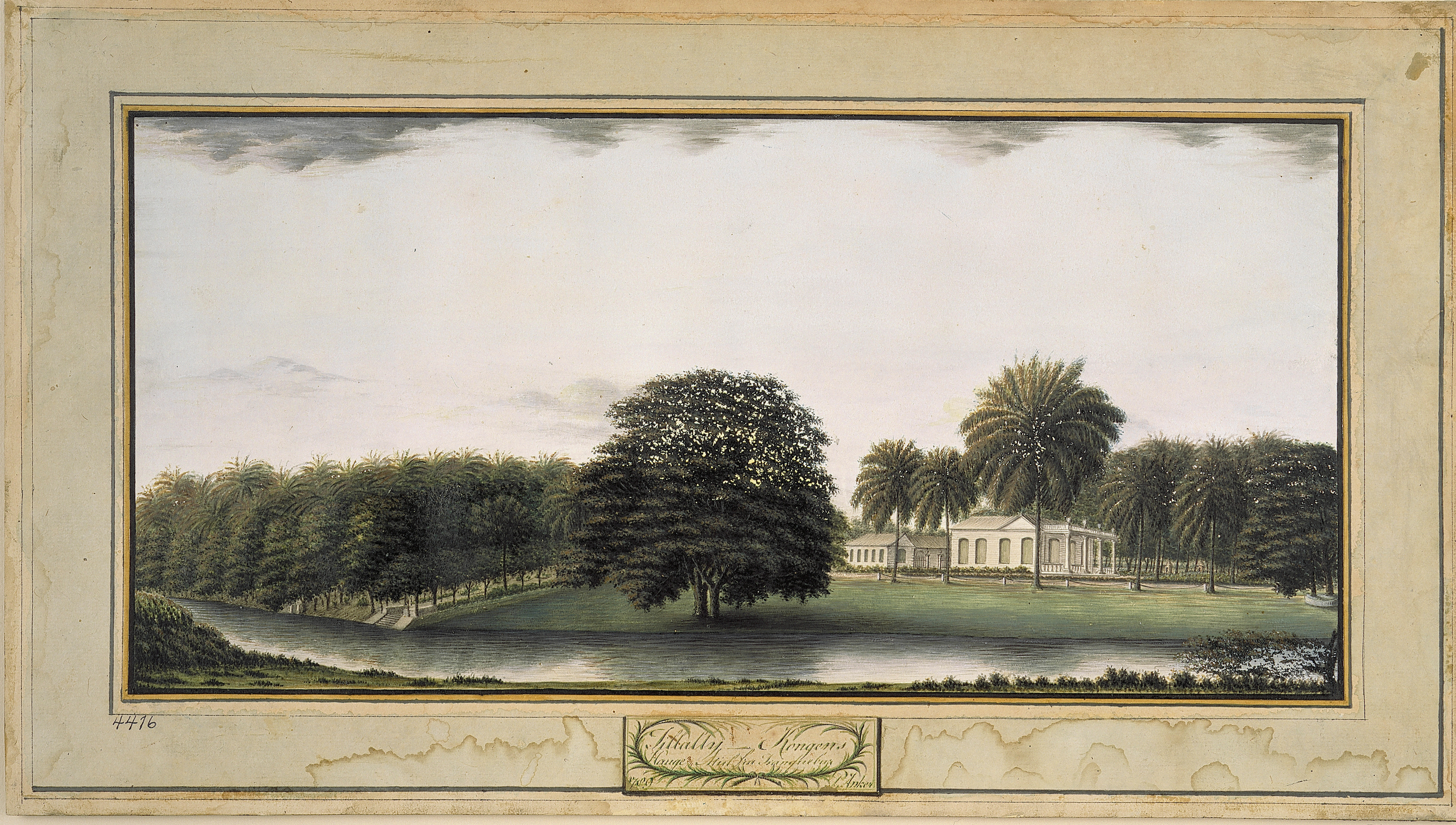
- Tillally, the governor`s country residence, by Peter Anker
Date	30 June 1756
Location	Tillali, (Near modern-day Thanjavur) 11°1′44″N 79°47′44″E
Result	Thanjvurian victory
Territorial changes	Tillali occupied by Thanjavurian forces

Belligerents
Danish India	Thanjavur

Commanders and leaders
(Danish India) Peter Hesselberg † (Danish India) Hans Jacob Attrup †	Pratap Singh; Perumal Naik

Strength
27 Soldiers of the corps 30 Indian sepoys Total: 55–57	2,000–4,000 Cavalry; 2,000 men Total: 4,000–6,000

Casualties and losses
55 killed	300 killed
- 45 Civilians killed

The Tillali Massacre (Danish: Massakren i Tillali), or the Battle of Tillali (Danish: Slaget ved Tillali) was a confrontation on 30 June 1756 during the Cattle War, between the Danish command at the village of Tillali (Thillaiyadi) and the Raja of Thanjavur, Pratap Singh. The confrontation resulted in a Thanjavurian victory and a subsequent massacre of most Danish troops. After the victory, the Thanjavurian army led a further invasion into Danish Tranquebar and besieged Fort Dansborg.

== Background and prelude ==
In January 1756 a newly appointed local governor called Perumal Naik was allegedly said to have raided Danish Tranquebar's surrounding districts. In June the same year, a similar incident occurred, where Naik stole a herd of cattles. As commander of the Danish border, Captain Strøbel was ordered to retaliate and marched from the Danish border town of Tillali, to occupy the Thanjavurian town of Anandamangalam with 60 men of the corps and 20-30 sepoys. The remaining force at Tillali received Danish and Indian reinforcements, to protect to border.

=== Prelude ===
In reaction to the Danish mobilization of Tranquebar and fortification of Anandamangalam, the nayak of Thanjavur, Pratap Singh, sent roughly 2000 cavalry and 2000 well armed men together with Perumal Naik's army into Danish territory. The combined Thanjavurian army soon reached the Tillali, where the stationed Danes were attacked.

== Confrontation ==
Maps

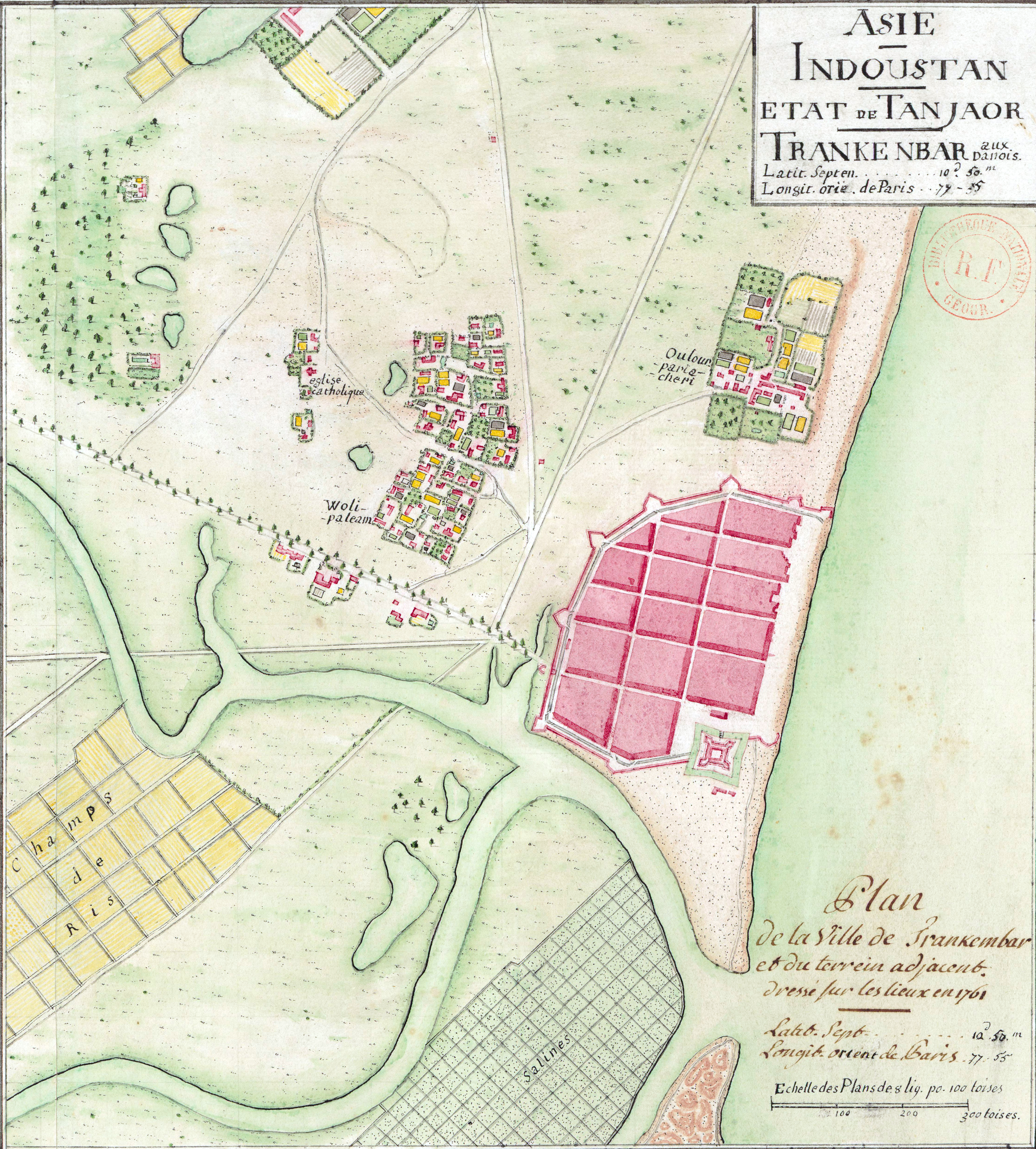
Plan of the town of Trankenbar and the adjacent land, drawn up on the site in 1761 (by engineering captain Leveux)

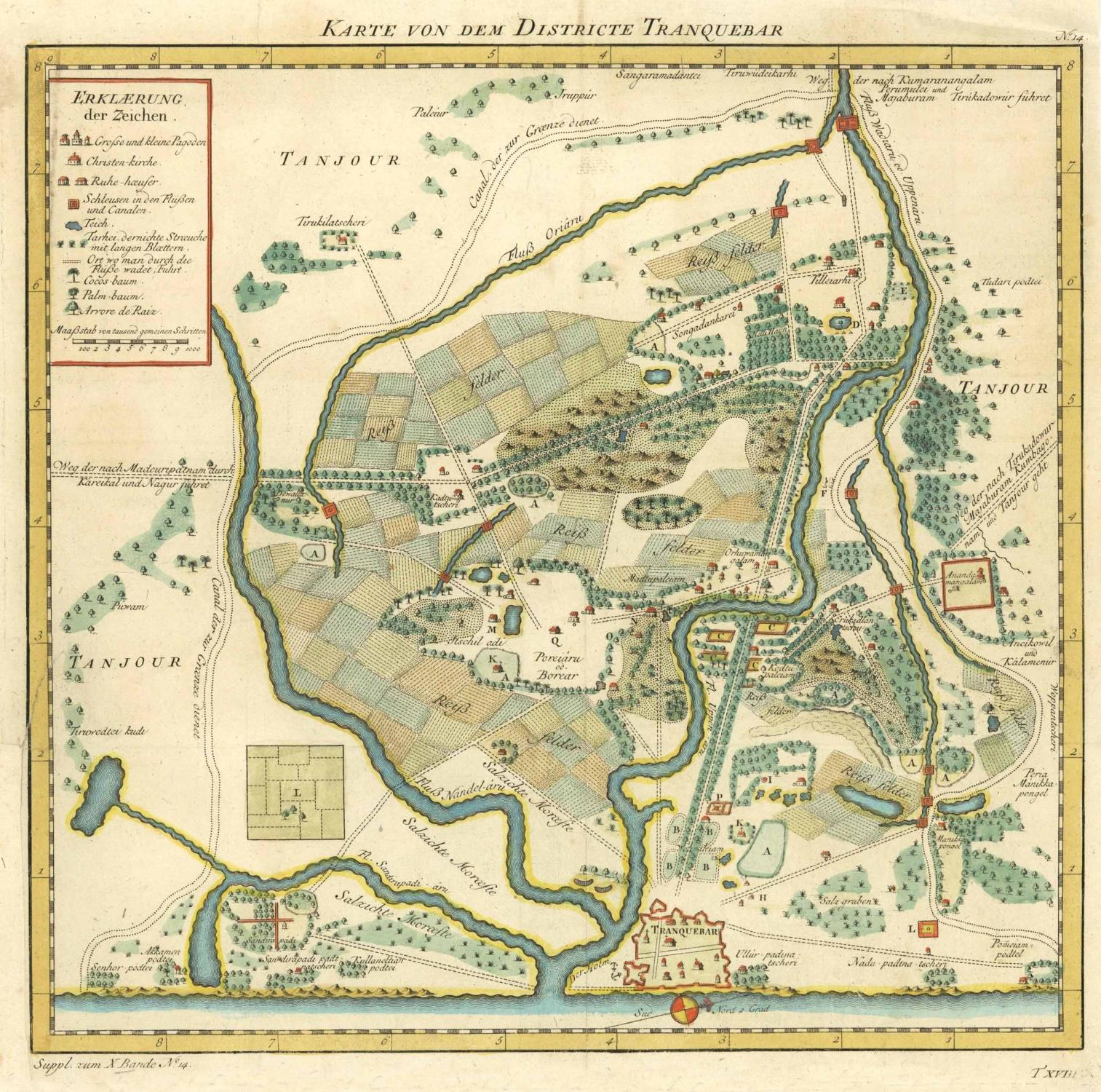
Map over the Danish districts of Tranquebar. Tillali is marked as Tilletarche

In command of the Danish outpost in Tillali, were captain Peter Hesselberg, with his Son-in-law, Hans Jacob Attrup, as ensign. In Tillali the first confrontations occurred in the local hostel and pagoda. The Danish forces retreated and took coverage behind a wall, where they got reinforcements from Tillali's local bailiff. Yet the large Thanjavurian army were no match for the small Danish contingent and the Danes were subsequently massacred.

=== Massacre ===
Sources describing the incident differ on the death toll. Most agree that both captain, Peter Hesselberg, and ensign, Hans Attrup were killed.

Additionally, according to Hans Gregersen in his book Trankebar, two lower officers, 24 European and dozens of Indians were killed. All but one, who hid in the pagoda remained unharmed. A similar claim is made by Danish historian, Kay Larsen, in the brugsforeningsbladet he notes that two officers, 24 European and 45 local people from Tillali died. According to Holger Christensen's Det danske fremstoed i Indien i 1750-erne 18 men of the corps (Note: The term "men of the corps" refers only to the Danish royal soldiers, and not the Indian sepoys) died. Another claim by Bering Liisberg's Danmarks søfart og søhandel claims that 54 people were either killed or wounded.

== Aftermath ==
After the massacre at Tillali and the Danish retreat from Anandamangalam, all Danish districts outside Tranquebar were occupied and raided. Fort Dansborg was temporarily put in a state of emergency and besieged by the Thanjavurians.

== See also ==
- Danish overseas colonies – 1537–1953 colonies of Denmark–Norway and Denmark
- Siege of Dansborg (1644) – Siege in Tranquebar, India 1644
- Dano-Mughal War – Danish colonial conflict against the Mughal Empire
- Assault on Osu – 1678 Attack on Osu between Akwamu and Accrans forces
