= Bernt Pessart =

17th-century Danish governor and president of Danish India from 1636–1643

3rd Governor of Tranquebar
- In office 1636–1643 Co-leading with Jacob van Stackenborg
- Monarch: Christian IV
- Preceded by: Roland Crappé
- Succeeded by: Willem Leyel

Personal details
- Born: Unknown
- Died: 1645 Near Manila
- Spouse: Anna Pessart

Military service
- Allegiance: Dutch Republic c. 1631, 1644–1645; Denmark–Norway 1636–1643 (Note: Still claimed to be president of Tranquebar until his death)
- Rank: President
- Battles/wars: Conflict between Willem Leyel and Bernt Pessart; Dano-Mughal War; Capture of the ship The Bengali Prize; Skirmish at the Strait of Malacca; Ambush near the Bay of Manila †

Bernt Pessart (Note: Alternative spellings include Berndt Pessart or Berent Pessart) (d June 1645) was a Danish overhoved and self-proclaimed President of Danish India from 1636 to 1643. In his early years, he served the Dutch East India Company in Bantam, and in September 1636, he became governor of Danish Tranquebar. He would serve as governor until his deposition in 1643, when he would flee to Japan. During his exile, Pessart would be confronted by the Dutch at Malacca, where he would be detained and imprisoned by Dutch authorities. His imprisonment would be taken to a court in Bantam, where the judge ruled he would again serve the Dutch by spying on the Spanish in the Philippines. He would die in June 1645 during a voyage to Manila by an ambush of local natives.

== First Dutch service and early Danish service ==
Bernt Pessart is first known for his service to the Dutch East India Company. He had served the company in Batavia for many years where he would be referred to in 1631 as a free citizen. Pessart would also, during his first Dutch service, have a part in a merchant ship that was to set sail for Cambodia.

Bernt Pessart would a couple of years later serve the Danish East India Company and arrive at Danish Tranquebar in September 1636. Here he would be assumed Chief merchant of Fort Dansborg. However, on 9 November 1636, he was announced overhoved of the company by Roland Crappé.

== President of Danish India ==
Short after his takeover, Pessart would assume the title of president. Early on he would be described as a drunken and reckless libertine, who brought confusion to all merchants. He would reside in Masulipatnam (Note: During the late regime of Roland Crappé Masulipatnam was made the Danish Company's headquarters, and it would also be here that Pessart would be officially proclaimed as overhoved.) instead of Tranquebar, which he would leave to chief merchant Jacob von Stackenborg.

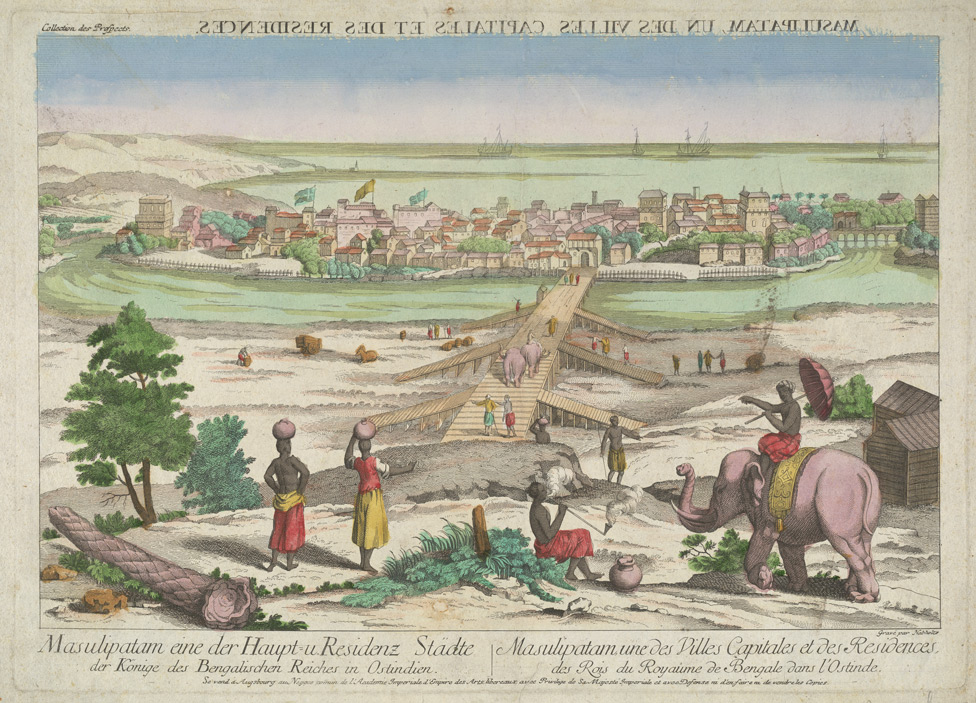
View of Masulipatam (Bandar), 1676. Originally an unimportant fishing village, yet in the 17th century its commercial importance began to grow.

Masulipatnam was the center of the cotton trade, which was heavily demanded on the Sunda Islands. Though you could also buy tobacco, iron, steel, indigo dye, and various gems.

In late 1639 English, Danish, and Dutch agents in Masulipatnam were given the order to meet with the Golconda king. When meeting the king, he demanded that they give him 600.000 pagodas, as the local governor had promised. The Dutch scrapped 3.000 padogas, an elephant, and five Persian horses. The English could not muster anything, to which the king got mad and expelled the English from Masulipatnam. The Danes got away with promising 2.000 pagodas when the next ship from Denmark had arrived.

Moreover, Pessart would encumber large debts from the start of his administration, and he would attempt several risky voyages to make money. Pessart ignored the Danish East India Company's most profitable commercial contacts, like Thanjavur and Makassar, to instead trade in less certain places Like Persia. He would also ignore Tranquebar which fell into chaos. (Note: Two Danish priests would cause such havoc and violence in Tranquebar by their drunkenness, that incoming traders would avoid the settlement.)

=== Financial difficulties ===
Danish East India
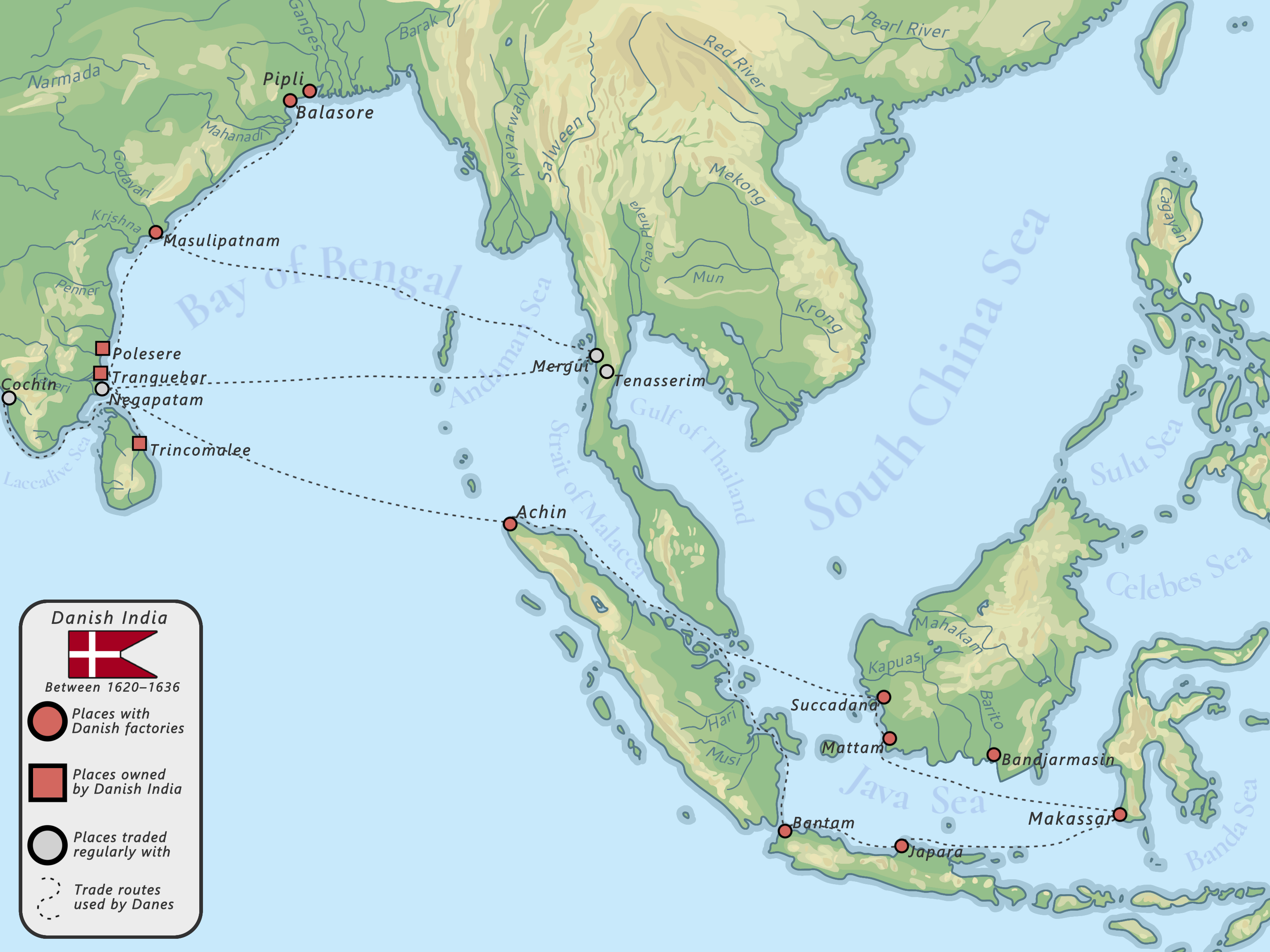
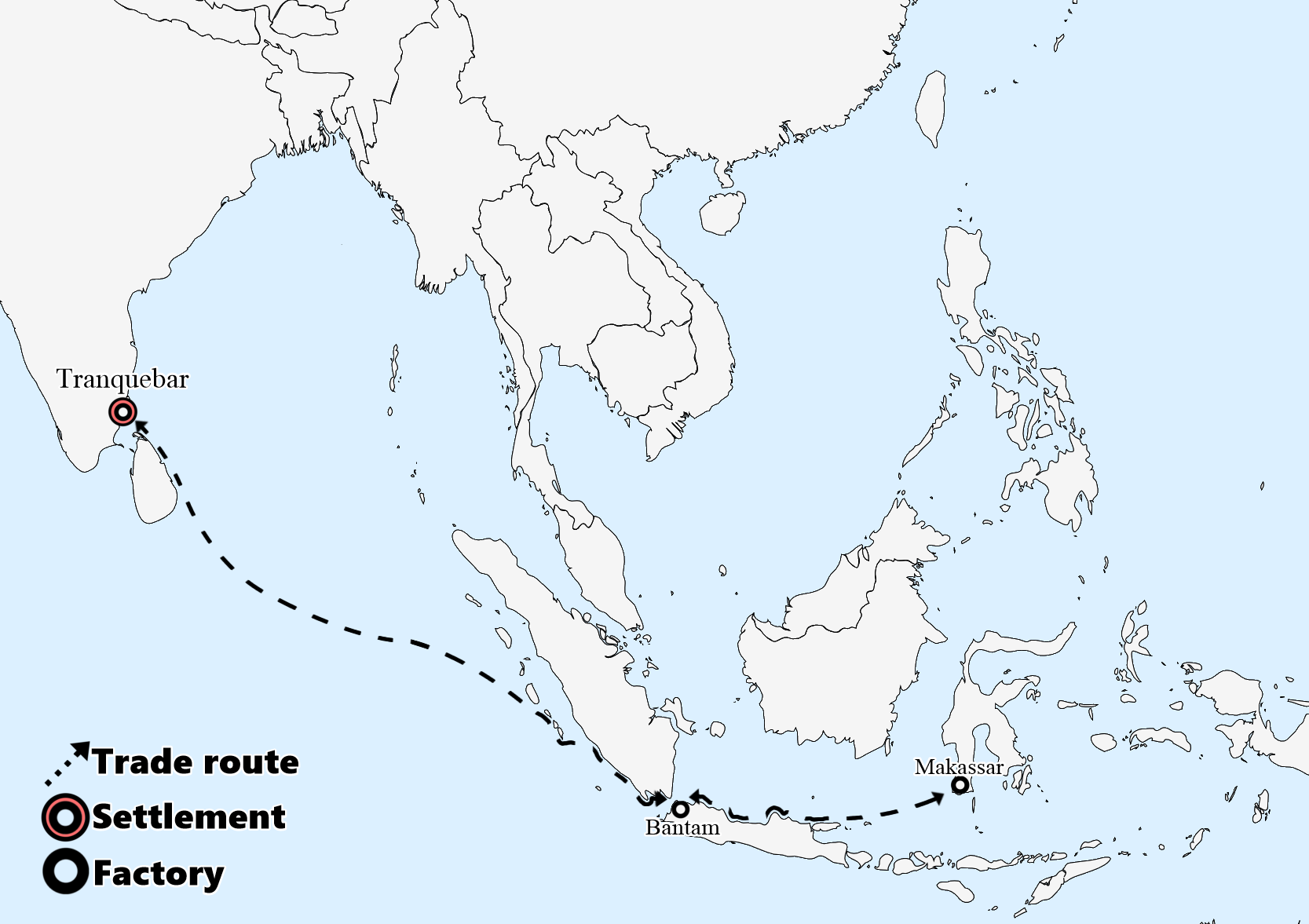
Top: Danish settlements, factories, and trade routes during most of Pessart's administration.
Bottom: Danish settlements, factories, and trade routes during the end of Pessart's administration and afterward.

These difficulties forced Pessart to experiment with Diamond trade in the region, which he sought to sell on Sumatra. He also sent a ship to Persia hoping to gain profit, yet the goods could not be sold for financial gain. Amid the difficulties, Pessart tried to sell Fort Dansborg and Tranquebar to the Portuguese, in that the headquarters now had moved to Masulipatnam, though the Portuguese would reject this offer. A similar offer was given to the English but to no avail.

The financial difficulties culminated in the Loss of the St. Jacob in 1640. The ship was on its way home when it got hit by a hurricane and was wrecked off the coast of Pipeley. Pessart estimated the initial loss to be about 150.000 Danish rigsdaler and would take a big hit on the company's economy. Additionally, 16 Danes would die in Bengali imprisonment. When the creditors in Masulipatnam, who had already gotten frustrated over Pessart's debts, heard about this, they demanded he be arrested.

=== War with Bengal ===
Pessart and the Danes viewed the loss of the St. Jacob as a tyrannous act by the Bengalis, because of their lack of help and imprisonment of the Danish crew. Appalled, Pessart sent a formal declaration of war in 1642 and sent two Danish vessels to attack Bengal, in which they captured a large ship they renamed Den Bengalske Prise. The ship was then brought to Tranquebar, equipped with cannons to join the small operating Danish fleet. The privateering war would be continued by Pessart's successor Willem Leyel and succeeding governors.

=== Arrival of Willem Leyel ===
The rumours of Pessart's debts had long reached Copenhagen, and in response, Captain Willem Leyel would embark for Dansborg reaching it on 5 September 1643. Pessart did not welcome his arrival, and he would quickly leave for Masilupatnam, which Leyel opted to join. On their arrival in Masulipatnam Leyel was confronted with the large debts Pessart had encumbered. Upon hearing this, they continued to Emeldy, where Pessart would accidentally wreck the Den Bengalske Prise, though he would safely arrive in the town.

Witnessing all of this, Leyel decided to arrest Pessart while in his tent, although when confronting his tent, Pessart had already left Emeldy for Tranquebar, with Leyel hastily pursuing. Pessart reached Tranquebar safely and quickly began the preparations for a further departure. He instructed the commander of Fort Dansborg Jacob von Stackenberg to deny Leyel access to the fort and bought a yacht in Portuguese Nagapattinam, which he would use for his escape. The vessel was renamed Dend Gode Haab and had been filled with good cargo, which it was to sell in Japan.

== Departure to Japan ==
Pessart would depart from Tranquebar on 5 June 1644, with the initial goal of reaching Japan. He had possibly hoped for such profit that Leyel would not have reasons to arrest him, though his dreams were relatively unrealistic. Nonetheless, he sailed eastward through the Strait of Malacca to further get to Japan. Yet when reaching the strait, the Danes would have disagreements with the Dutch who took control of the strait in 1641. A minor skirmish followed, in which Pessart and his crew would be imprisoned.

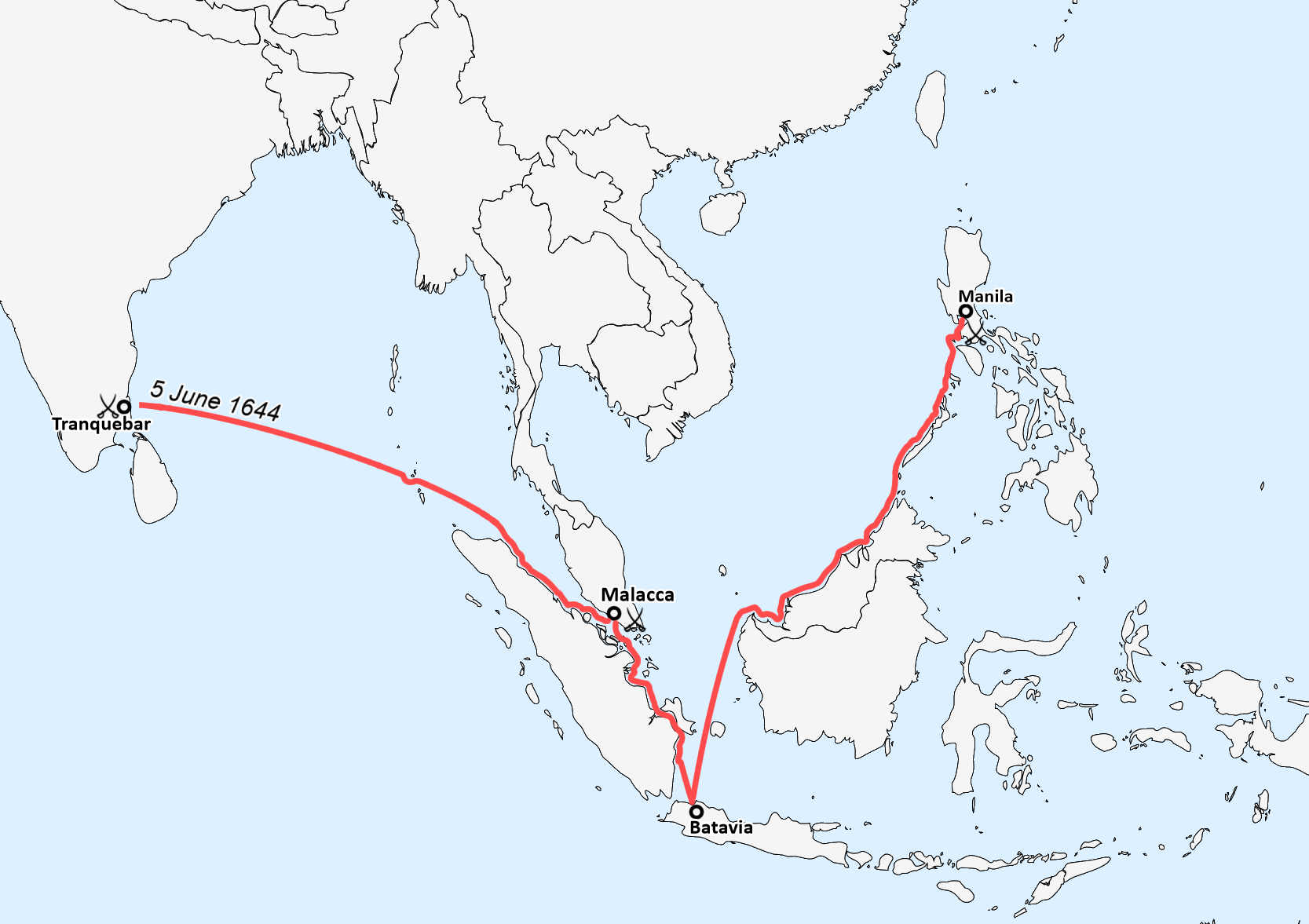
Bernt Pessart's voyage to Japan. Despite intending to reach Japan, Pessart instead ended up in the Spanish Philippines, where he would be killed and buried.

The Danes would be imprisoned for three months until Pessart had protested so much about their imprisonment, that the case would be taken to the court in Bantam. In Bantam, he and his crew would be imprisoned for another 6 months, while their case would be solved. In the end, it would be ruled that Pessart and his crew would instead go to the Philippines to espionage on the Spanish for the Dutch, though disguised as Danish merchants.

== Second Dutch service and death ==
Pessart set sail with an additional 10 men, one of whom would be captain of the expedition. When reached the Philippines, the Dutch captain had a hard time locating the Bay of Manila and they accidentally ended up in another nearby bay. It was decided to stay in the bay for a couple of days to gather more provisions. Pessart decided to take a dinghy out with some of his men to fish. When fishing, the men were ambushed by some local natives with bows and arrows. Pessart got shot, yet managed to get pulled back on board the dinghy, while he would gasp "Help me up, or I am a dead man!" When arriving back on the yacht Pessart was already dead, and on the night of the same day, he would be buried on an island nearby.

== See also ==
- Peter Anker
- Wolf Henrik von Kalnein – 17th-century Danish officer and governor of Danish India
- Ove Gjedde – Danish nobleman and Admiral of the Realm
- Asiatic Company – Defunct Danish trading company
- Willem Leyel's war on Golconda – 1640s minor war in India

== Works cited ==
- Wellen, Kathryn (2015). The Danish East India Company's War against the Mughal Empire, 1642-1698 (PDF). Royal Netherlands Institute for Southeast Asian and Caribbean Studies.
- Bredsdorff, Asta (2009). The Trials and Travels of Willem Leyel. Copenhagen: Museum Tusculanum Press. ISBN 9788763530231.
- Bredsdorff, Asta (1999). Søhistoriske Skrifter (PDF) (in Danish). Vol. XXI. Copenhagen: Handels- og Søfartsmuseet Kronborg.
- Knudsen, Karin (2017). "Kolonien Trankebar". Trankebar Foreningen. Archived from the original on 21 April 2024.
