= Cattle War =

Conflict between Danish India and the Thanjavur Maratha kingdom

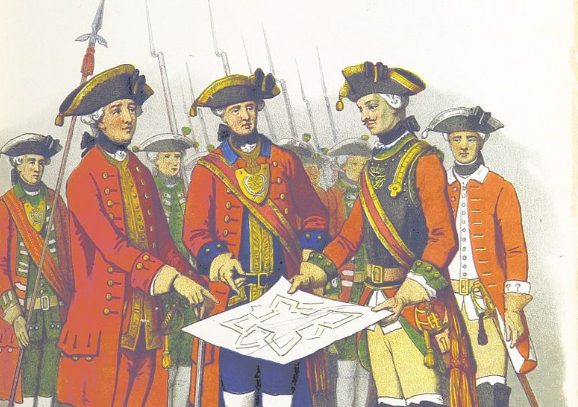
- Danish soldiers negotiating further territory to Tranquebar, 1750. By Otto Vaupell
Date	19 June – 6 July 1756
Location	Tranquebar 11°1′45″N 79°50′58″E
Result	Thanjavurian victory
Territorial changes	Status quo ante bellum

Belligerents
Danish India; French India	Thanjavur

Commanders and leaders
(Danish India) Hans Georg Krog (Danish India) Castonier (Danish India) Hesselberg † (Danish India) Attrup †; De leyrit Porcher	Pratap Singh; Perumal Naik; Manosiappa

Strength
c. 2,000 men 650 (French relief force) Total: c. 800	2,000–4,000 Cavalry; 2,000 infantry Total: 4,000–6,000

Casualties and losses
71 killed	Unknown

The Cattle War (Danish: Kvægkrigen) also commonly referred to as the Perumal War or the Perumal Naik-War (Danish: Perumalkrigen/Perumal Naik-krigen) was a colonial conflict between the Danish East India Company and the Thanjavur Maratha kingdom over the Danish governor Hans Georg Krog's expansionistic foreign policy. The conflict started over the raiding of Danish cattle by the local supervisor of a small land district, Perumal Naik.

== Background and prelude ==
Established in 1620 after a treaty between Ove Gjedde and Raghunatha Nayak, Fort Dansborg was the capital and center of commerce in Danish India, surrounded on land by the Kingdom of Thanjavur.

Map of Tranquebar

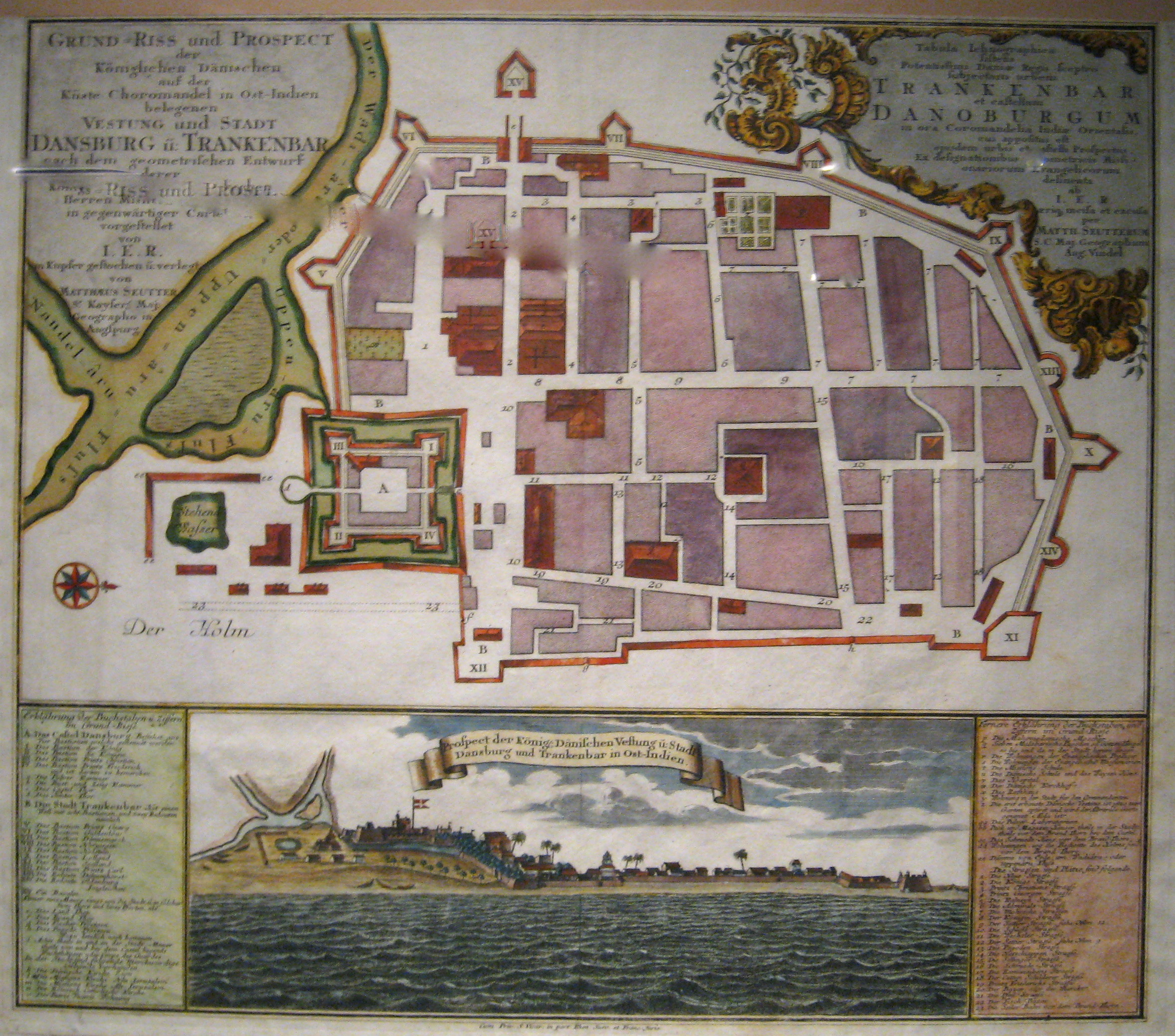
Historic map of Danish colony Tranquebar and Fort Dansborg, 1700s, along the coastline of Tamil Nadu, India.

On 25 June 1750, a Danish proposal from governor Bonsach on the surrounding hinterland of Dansborg was published. He proposed to the Nayak of Thanjavur that four nearby districts of an area of 60 km^{2} should be acquired by the Danish Company. Bonsach hoped to gain financial profit from the districts. The proposal was agreed upon with the Nayak and he mortgaged the areas to the authority in Dansborg. In return the Nayak of Thanjavur could retrieve the areas at any time.

Six years later, in January 1756, the newly appointed local supervisor, Perumal Naik, was alleged by the Danes to have raided the newly Danish land districts. On 17 June of the same year, Naik raided and stole a herd of cattle, which belonged to a Danish district. In response, the Danish government in Tranquerbar sent a small force of Indian sepoys to retake the lost cattle, although they were driven back. Negotiations followed, with the Thanjavurians requesting to have the cattle returned.

Instead the Danish governorate retaliated with a punitive expedition to capture the nearby village of Anandamangalam around Tranquebar.

== Confrontation ==
=== Danish attack ===
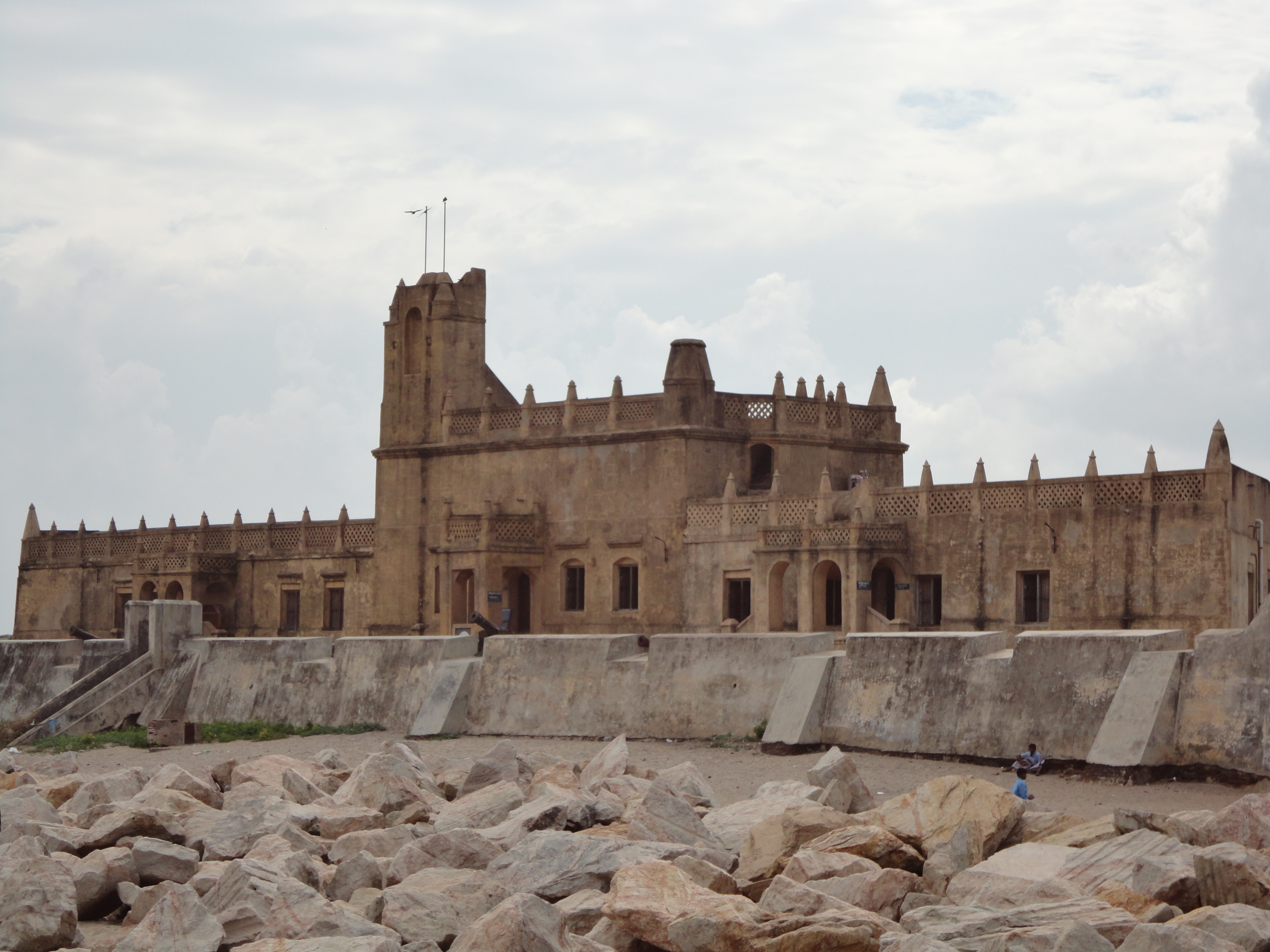
Danish Fort of Dansborg

On the night of 19 June, a contingent of the Danish corps took the village. In the next couple of days the Danes continuously fortified the pagoda, in the newly conquered village. Concurrently forces of Perumal Naik attacked the Danish fortified positions. The confrontations were followed by prolonged negotiations, which were inconclusive. According to governor Krog, Anandamangalam was a rightful property of the Danish East India Company, because of previous pledging of the village to the company in 1743, and he was therefore not willing to surrender the village. The governorate at Dansborg unilaterally agreed to keep the village as indemnity for the stolen cattle.

The Vayak of Thanjavur was astonished that the Danes used violence instead of diplomacy and promised that Thanjavur was ready for war.

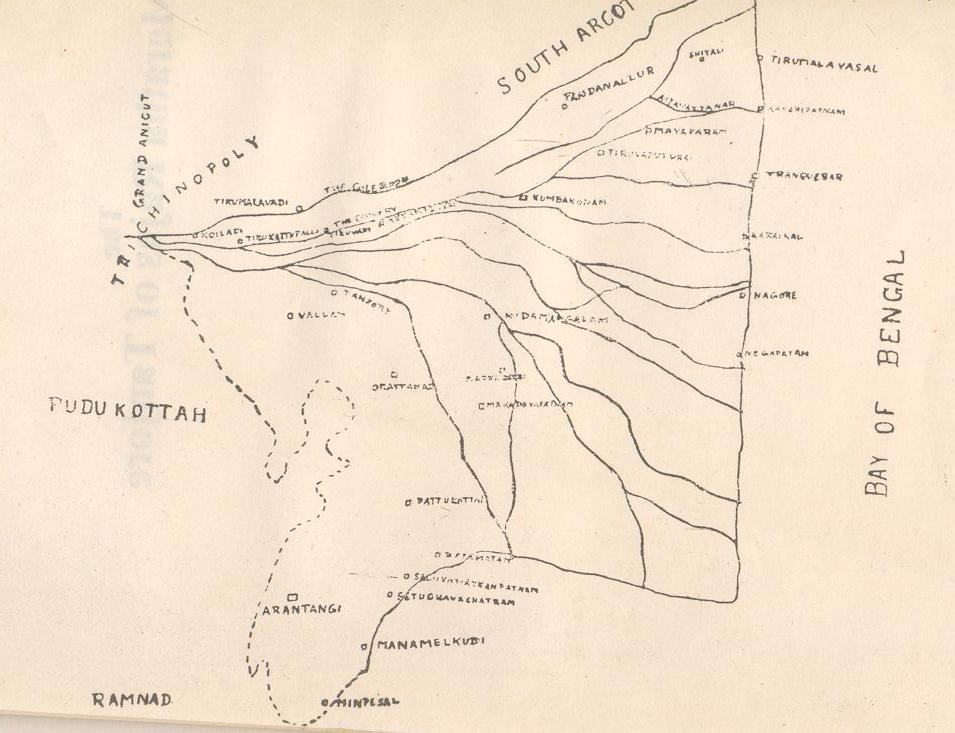
Map of Tanjore, Tranquebar and other surrounding areas

=== Thanjvurian response ===
On 29 June the Nayak and Perumal Naik were gathering troops and demanded the withdrawal of Danish troops from Anandamangalam. The Danes stayed in the village to preserve their prestige. On the same day the Danes inserted some 60 men at the nearby village of Tillali. The Danes knew that their forces were weak and therefore sought an alliance with France. A French relief force of 650 men was sent, but it was intercepted by the British before it could reach Tranquebar. The following day, 30 June, a larger force of Perumal Naik's men, and reportedly also the regular army of Tanjore, launched an attack early in the morning. The outpost in Tillali was overwhelmed and almost all of the Danish forces were killed, including captain Hesselberg. The confrontation at Tillali was followed up by minor skirmishes at Anandamangalam resulting in a Danish retreat to Tranquebar.

== Aftermath ==
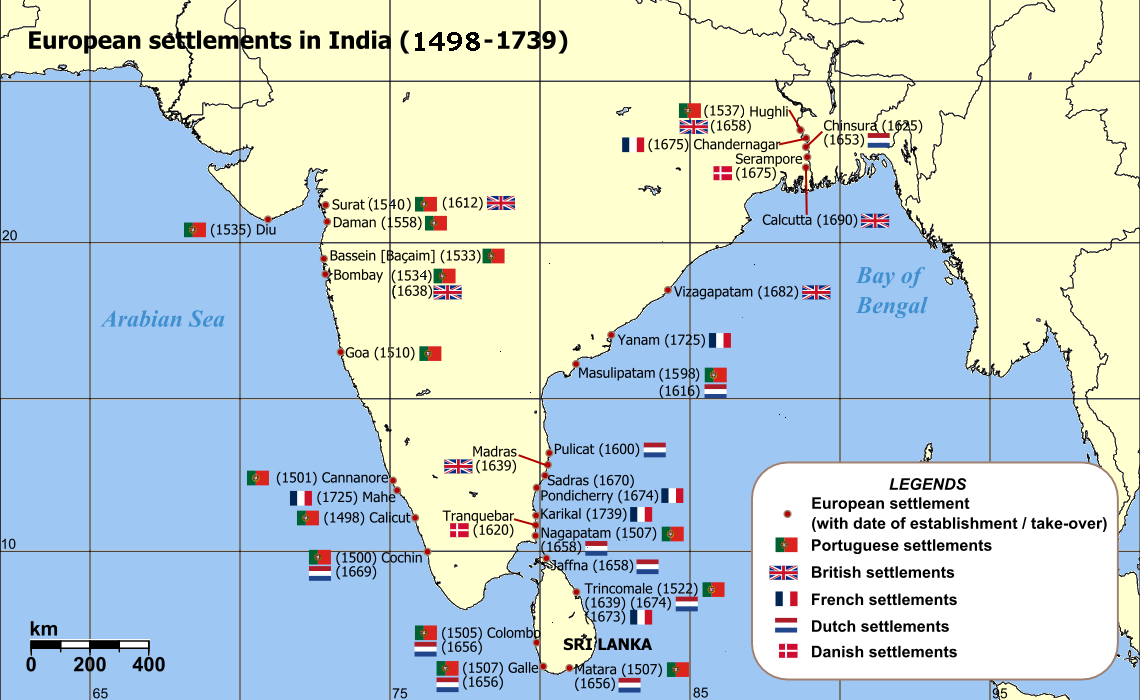
European settlements in India from 1498-1739

The Danes were militarily defeated, and no longer sought an expansion of their territorial presence in India. The Danes tried to persuade other European powers in the region to join them in order to ensure a favorable treaty.

They pressured the French with racism, stating that a white nation should never be beaten by a black nation, thereby hoping France would send further help. They tried similarly with the Dutch and British, stating that they must not assist "these pagans," but should help the Danes instead by "continuing our rightful weapons against these inhumans".

Governor Krog also tried to get help from the Kingdom of Mysore, but they rejected that proposal. There was no danger for the Danes, and on 6 July, the forces of the vayak drew back to Thanjavur. Krog resigned later that year due to his military failure.

== See also ==
- Tranquebar – Town in Mayiladuthurai district, Tamil Nadu, India
- Dano-Mughal War – Danish colonial conflict against the Mughal Empire
- Raghunatha Nayak
- Carnatic wars – 18th-century wars between the French and the British
- Siege of Dansborg (1644) – Siege in Tranquebar, India 1644
