= 1564 in Sweden =

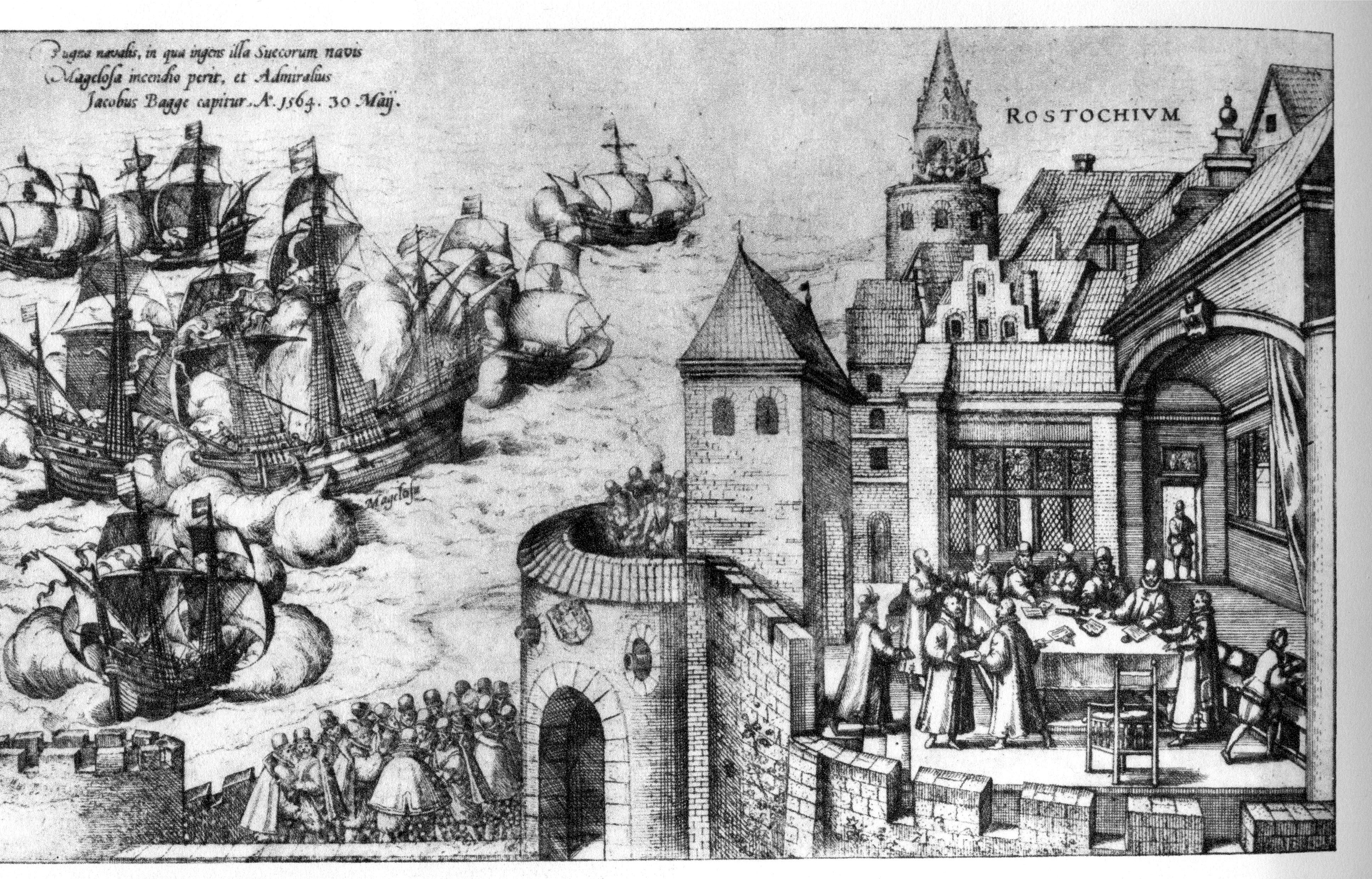
Makalös

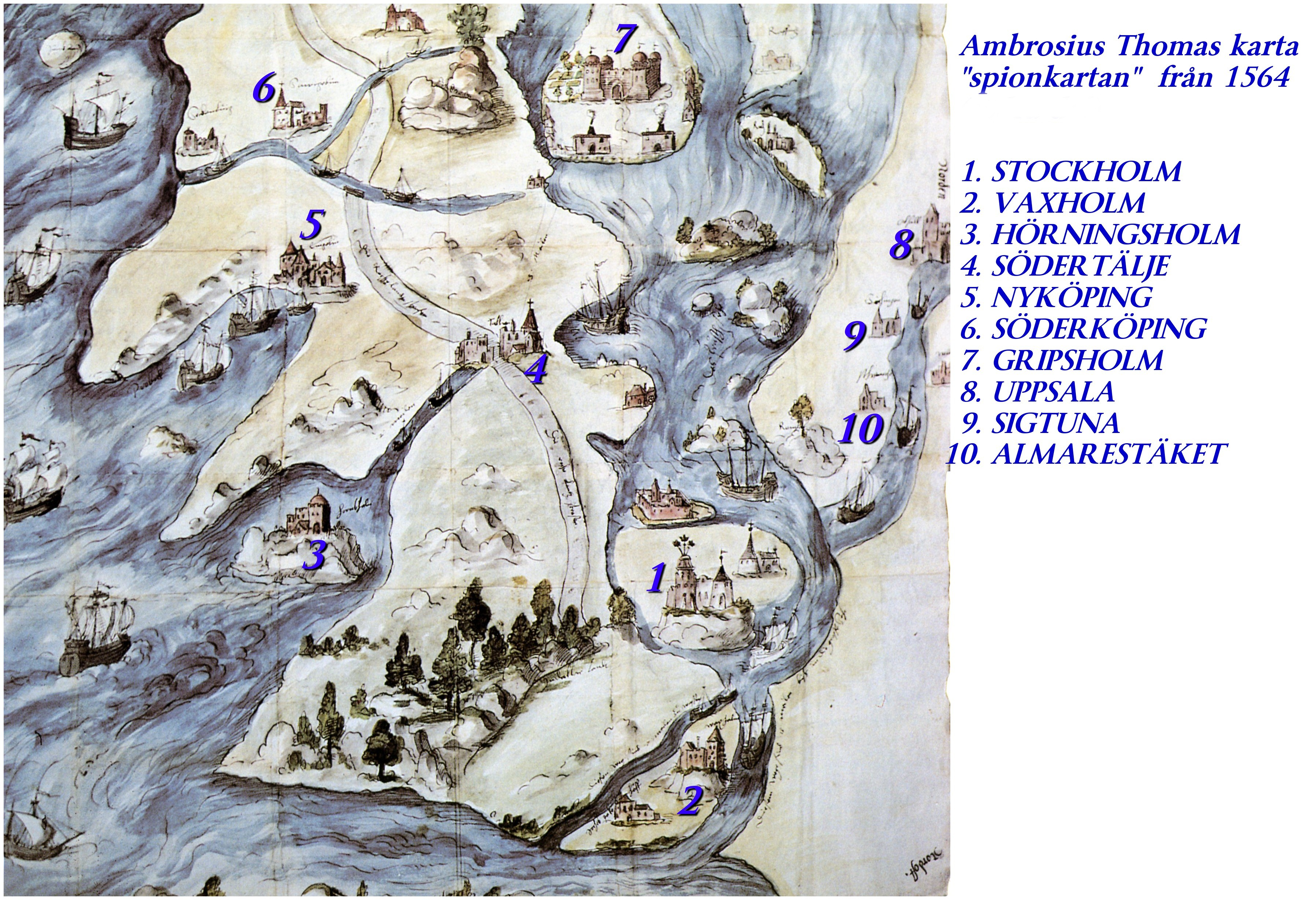
Map by Ambrosius Thoms.

Events from the year 1564 in Sweden

== Incumbents ==
- Monarch – Eric XIV

== Events ==
- February - Sweden pillage the Norwegian provinces of Jämtland, Härjedalen and Trondheim.
- 19 February - Armistice between Sweden and Denmark-Norway in Swedish Estonia.
- The Swedish battleship Mars was finished in 1564, under instruction from master shipwright Holgerd Olsson (Master Hollinger). It was the flagship of the Swedish fleet of 38 ships, and commanded by Admiral Jakob Bagge.
- 30–31 May - First battle of Öland (1564) off the coast of Oland, during the Nordic Seven Years War (1563-1570). On the second day of the battle, the Mars was boarded by the Danish-Lubeckian navy, caught fire and then exploded, "killing most of her crew as well as 300 of the boarders. Bagge was amongst the survivors.” The Swedish fleet withdrew to repair their fleet, returning to battle in July.
- 14 August – Swedish siege of Lyckå in Blekinge.
- 14 August - Action of 14 August 1564
- 24 August - Lyckå taken by the Swedes.
- 4 September - Sweden takes Danish Ronneby and massacres its inhabitants dubbed the Ronneby Bloodbath.
- June - Wedding between Princess Cecilia of Sweden and Christopher II, Margrave of Baden-Rodemachern.
- 27 September – Lyckås and Avaskär are burned by the Swedes who then evacuate Blekinge.
- 11–13 October – Danish attack on Kalmar repelled.
- 21 November – Peace treaty between Sweden and Russia, to last for seven years.
- A map of Sweden, attributed to Ambrosius Thoms, was completed this year. It is presumed to have been created to aid in a coup-d’etat to liberate John III (half-brother of King Erik XIV, who would become the next King of Sweden in 1569) from Gripsholm Castle. John was imprisoned there in 1563 for treason, along with his new wife, on account of their marriage, because she was the younger sister of Poland's King Sigismund II Augustus, with whom King Erik XIV was at war.

== Births ==
- 25 September - Magnus Brahe (1564–1633), Lord High Constable and Lord High Steward of Sweden (died 1633)
- Elizabeth, called Isabella, was born to John III and Catherine Jagiellon, during their imprisonment in Gripsholm Castle. She died at the age of two, also during their imprisonment, which lasted until 1567.

== Deaths ==
- October 9 - Nils Svantesson Sture, died in the Battle of Mared, part of the noble Sture family and Swedish military leader.
- September - Klas Kristersson Horn, part of the Swedish Navy
