= Battle of Öland (disambiguation) =

The Battle of Öland can refer to several naval battles fought around the Baltic island of Öland:

- Battle of Öland (1563) during the Northern Seven Years' War (1563-1570)
- Battle of Öland during the Scanian War fought in 1676
- Battle of Öland (1789) during the Russo-Swedish War (1788-1790)
- First battle of Öland (1564) during the Northern Seven Years' War (1563-1570)
