= Skovkloster Abbey =

Former Danish Benedictine house

Coordinates: 55°14′45″N 11°44′55″E

St. Peders Kloster, later called Skovkloster, was an important early Benedictine house at Næstved, Denmark, active in 1135-1559.

== History ==
St. Peders Priory, later Skovkloster, was founded by the powerful noble, Peder Bodilsen, his mother, Bodil, and his brothers, Henning and Jørgen with several donations (Danish:gavebrev) in 1135. Among them they gave town lands and many other farms scattered across Zealand and Falster. Archbishop Eskild, who was a personal friend of Bernard of Clairvaux, was enthusiastic about the establishment of a religious house at Naestved. Skovkloster's royal charter from Eric III of Denmark in 1140 is the oldest still in existence for any monastic house in Denmark. The original monastery and church lay inside the town on the main square of Great Naestved but no trace of it remains. The small original church was constructed out of granite in Romanesque style without a tower. A second church across town was constructed of granite, dedicated to St. Morten a few decades later which also belonged to St. Peders. The archives of St Peders have been remarkably preserved at Herlufsholm. Among other documents is the most complete account ledger for any monastic house in Denmark. These documents provide insight not only into the daily workings of St. Peders, but other houses as well. The National Library has in its collection the Naestved Annals (Danish:Årbogen) as well as lists of benefactors and an obituary book (Danish: dødebog).

The establishment of St. Peders put Naestved on the map; there had been two small villages, Great Naestved and Little Naestved, on the banks of the Suså since Viking times. They grew together grew into the third largest town in Denmark and the largest on Zealand through trade. It was a logical place to offload goods and passengers going into or out of Zealand.

The monks built a Romanesque church in Naestved called 'St. Peders' which was a simple single nave building without a tower completed by 1200. St. Morten's church was rebuilt on its present location in the mid-13th century. Naestved was a good location for additional houses; the Franciscans arrived about 1240 and the Dominicans established a house at Naestved before 1266. The prior of St Peder's was also the lord of the city, and the market fees were paid directly to the monastery for the maintenance of the house and its operations. Even today the city's coat of arms has the keys of St. Peter on it as a reminder of the city's origins.

St. Peter's was moved 2 kilometers outside Naestved about 1200 where the monks built a new and larger complex with its own church (Herlufsholm Kirke) and ranges for dormitories, lay brothers, a hospital, refectory making it one of the larger Benedictine religious houses in Denmark. The name change to 'Forest Abbey' (Danish:Skovkloster) reflects the change in location. Skovkloster became an abbey under the Bishop of Roskilde by order of the Curia in Rome. A fire in 1261 destroyed the complex which was rebuilt in Gothic style. By that time it had already come into possession of more than 100 income properties in Zealand, Skåne, and Falster. Bishops and kings also extended privileges or rent rights to several special incomes. Several abbots are remembered. Abbot Mathias who died in 1419 was praised for his care of the monks for 28 years and for improving some of the buildings which had fallen into disrepair. Abbot Jens caused trouble in the abbey when he implemented reforms for a stricter rule, some of the monks rebelled. In the 1400'a

Naestved became an important port for the Hanseatic League which brought the town to its economic height. The city's wealth also brought the establishment of a Dominican house for nuns at Gavnø in 1390. The monastery experienced difficulty in keeping enough lay brothers to do the field work on the many farms which supported the Benedictines. The monks eventually had to split their time between farm work and prayers.

St Peders church was expanded and completely rebuilt by 1375 in the Gothic style out of brick, the most common building material of the age. It has an unusually wide nave and remains a fine example of Danish Gothic architecture. In 1500 a tower was added to St Peders, slightly off-kilter from the rest of the church which wasn't corrected until the major restoration of the church in the 1880s. St Peders Church reached its existing form.

=== Dissolution ===
The early 16th century were turbulent as Denmark struggled over whether its religious loyalty lay with the Roman Catholic Church or a Protestant church controlled by the rulers of Denmark. With its Hanseatic ties, Naestved's loyalties lay with imprisoned Christian II, Denmark's last Catholic king and his agent, Count Christoffer. As early as 1527 the Franciscan houses in Denmark were forced to close, often violently. The Franciscan Friary at Naestved was the location of refuge for many of the homeless friars. Friar Rasmus Olsen and Friar Jacob took down eyewitness accounts of the various expulsions of the Franciscans which were collected and published long after under the title, 'Chronicle of the Expulsion of the Grayfriars' (Danish: Udjagelse af Gråbrødrenes fra Danmark). The Franciscans were hounded from their monastery in 1532. Open civil war called the 'Count's Feud' broke out between Prince Christian, soon to be Christian III of Denmark and Count Christoffer. Less than two years later Christian III was firmly in control of all of Denmark including Skåne.

Denmark became officially Lutheran in October 1536 and all monastic houses and their property became crown property. In an unusual move the monks at Skovkloster were permitted to remain in the abbey which passed to the Lutheran superintendent, later Bishop of Aarhus, Ove Bille in 1537. The last abbot, Christoffer Hansen, handed the keys of the abbey complex over to Oluf Trolle in 1559 as the monks were forced from the abbey. He was one of Frederik II's advisors and a national naval hero. Herluf Trolle owned a huge estate at Hillerød in north Zealand called Hillerødsholm and was persuaded by the king to trade that estate for Skovkloster. Trolle agreed and moved to what he renamed Herlufsholm (Danish: Herluf's Island) about 1560. The king promptly began building Frederiksborg Palace. Herluf Trolle converted the abbey into a manor house and estate, and before he died in 1565, he and his wife, Birgitte Mogensdatter Gøye, who was childless, founded the boarding school Herlufsholm for 'youth of noble and honorable heritage'. She died in 1574; both were buried in Herlufsholm Church.

There is an interesting legend about Lady Gøye's posthumous desire to see the school persist. After her death, the family attempted to wrest control of the estate from the school. They were summoned to Copenhagen to produce the letter of gift establishing the school. The family was unable to produce it, to their embarrassment. But it threw the ownership of the estate into confusion. Lady Gøye appeared to the pastor in charge of the school the night before he was to leave for Copenhagen to try to prove the school's right to retain the property. She appeared to him and went to a large table where she repeatedly struck one of the legs and then vanished. The next morning the pastor went to the table and found a secret compartment containing the Gøye's letter of gift leaving Herlufsholm to the school, thereby securing its future.

== Later history ==
Herlufsholm Boarding School (Danish: Herfulsholm Kostskole) was established by the Trolle's and properties attached to the deed ensured it was adequately funded. However, the descendants of Herlufsholm weren't as enthusiastic about the loss of such a magnificent and valuable property to the school. Children served as governors of the school, which was established for 42 students.

In the 1870s a major reconstruction of the school was undertaken. All of the remaining monastery buildings were demolished, only the cellar of the 'Monastery Building' and a much restored Herlufsholm church incorporating elements of the original remain from the monastery. The newer Herlufsholm buildings were constructed in the Gothic style out of the same materials to reflect the heritage of the school.

The two churches in Naestved once belonging to the Benedictines became the parish churches for the town with St Peder's taking precedence. St Peders Church was restored to its Gothic style in the 1880s. St Peder's Church has three bells in the tower, one of which dates from before the Reformation. Oluf Kegge and Johannes Pavli's bell cast in 1488 is still in use.

The organ at St Peter's was first installed in 1586 as a swallow's nest organ high in a loft above the chancel. It was constructed by Master Hans Brebus. Brebus was a Flemish immigrant who built organs as early as 1570. In time he became the royal organ maker under Frederick II and Christian III.

The church is famous for its medieval frescoes. One of the most important is that of Valdemar IV and Queen Helvig kneeling before God.

== Sources ==
- Helms, H. J. St Peders Kloster Naestved. 1940.
- Statens Archiver 'St Peders Kloster Naestved 1200-1477'.
- Salmonsens Conversationslexikon. 'Skovkloster'. p. 319-320
- Thorpe, Benjamin. 'Northern Mythology"
