= Herluf Trolle =

Danish naval hero

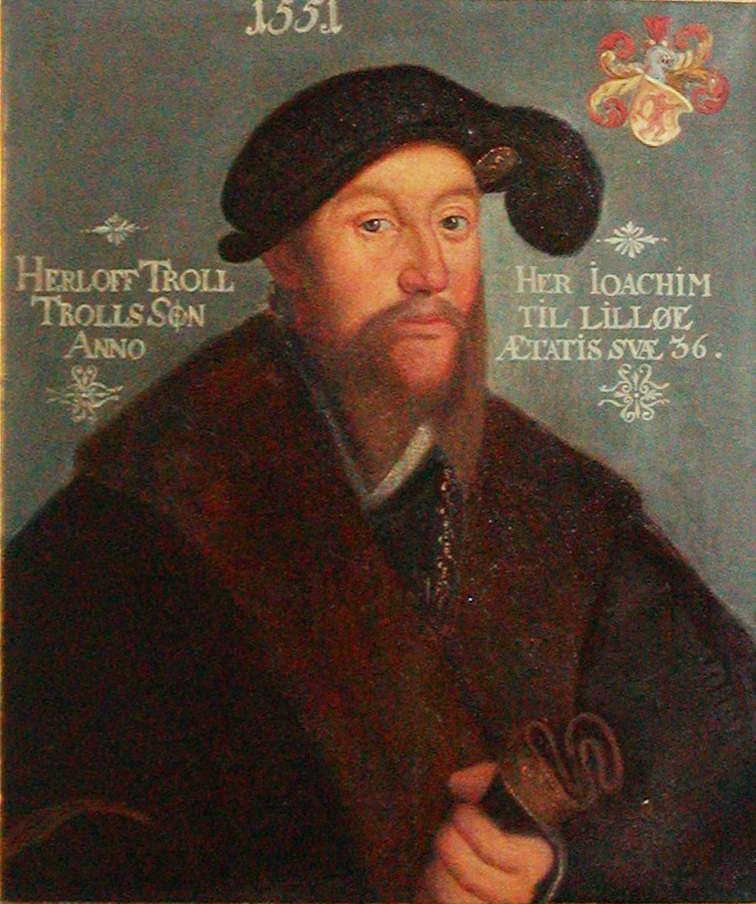
Herluf Trolle (1551)

Herluf Trolle (14 January 1516 – 25 June 1565) was a Danish naval officer, Admiral of the Fleet and co-founder of Herlufsholm School (Herlufsholm Skole og Gods), a private boarding school at Næstved on the island of Zealand in Denmark.

== Early life ==
Herluf Trolle was born at Lillø in Norra Åsum parish in Scania. He was born into the noble Trolle line of Swedish origins. He was the son of Kirsten Herlufsdatter Skave and Sir Joachim Arvidsen Trolle, Lord of Lillö; grandson of justiciar Arvid Trolle (c. 1440–1505), Lord of Bergkvara, and the latter's second wife Beate Iversdatter (ca 1440–1487), heiress of Lillö, and daughter of lord Iver Axelsen til Thott, fiefholder of the island of Gulland.

At the age of nineteen, Trolle went to Metropolitanskolen (Vor Frue Skole) at Copenhagen, subsequently completing his studies at Wittenberg University from 1536–1537. Here he adopted the views of the German Lutheran reformer Philipp Melanchthon (1497–1560), with whom he was in intimate correspondence for some years.

His marriage with Birgitte Gøye (1511–1574), the daughter of Lord High Treasurer Mogens Gøye (ca. 1470–1544), brought him a rich inheritance, and in 1557 he was summoned to the membership of the High Council of Denmark. Both King Christian III and King Frederik II had a very high opinion of Trolle's trustworthiness and ability and employed him in various diplomatic missions. Herluf Trolle's lively manners made him popular everywhere but not with his wife's nephew Peder Oxe (1520–1575), the subsequently distinguished finance minister, whose narrow grasping ways, especially as the two men were near neighbors, did not contribute towards family harmony. It was Trolle whom Frederik II appointed to investigate the charges of malversation brought against Oxe. Both Trolle and his wife were far renowned for their piety and good works, and their whole household had to conform to their example or seek service elsewhere.

A man of culture, he translated David's 31st Psalm into Danish verse. He also promoted literature and learning by educating poor students both at home and abroad, endowing Latin schools and encouraging historical research.

== Military career ==
In 1559, Trolle was appointed Admiral and Inspector of the Fleet, a task which occupied all his time and energy. In 1563 he superseded the aged Peder Skram as admiral in chief in the Northern Seven Years' War. On 20 May he went to sea with twenty-one ships of the line and five smaller vessels and, after uniting with a Lübeck squadron of six line ships, encountered, off the isle of Öland, a superior Swedish fleet of thirty-eight ships under Norwegian born, Swedish admiral Jakob Bagge (1502–1577). Supported by two other Danish ships, Trolle attacked the Swedish flagship Mars (also known as Makalös or Jutehataren), then the largest warship in northern waters, but was beaten off at nightfall. The fight was renewed at six o'clock the following morning, when the Makalös was again attacked and forced to surrender, but blew up immediately afterwards, no fewer than 300 Lübeck and Danish sailors perishing with her. But the Swedish admiral was captured and the remnant of the Swedish fleet took refuge at Stockholm.

Despite the damage done to his own fleet and flagship Fortuna by this great victory, Trolle, on 14 August, fought another but indecisive action with a second Swedish fleet under Finnish born, Swedish nobleman and Naval Admiral Klas Horn (1517–1566), Lord of Joensuu, his distant kinsman, and kept the sea until 13 October. Trolle spent the winter partly at his castle of Herlufsholm completing his long-cherished plan of establishing a school for all classes, and partly at Copenhagen equipping a new fleet for the ensuing campaign. On 1 June 1565 he set sail with twenty-eight liners, which were reinforced off Fehmarn by five Lübeck vessels. Horn had put to sea still earlier with a superior fleet and the two admirals encountered off Fehmarn on 4 June. The fight was severe but indecisive, and both commanders finally separated to repair their ships. Trolle had been severely wounded in the thigh and shoulder, but he would not let the ship's surgeon see to his injuries until every one else had been attended to. This characteristic act of unselfishness was his undoing, for he died at Copenhagen on 25 June, seventeen days after they had put him ashore.

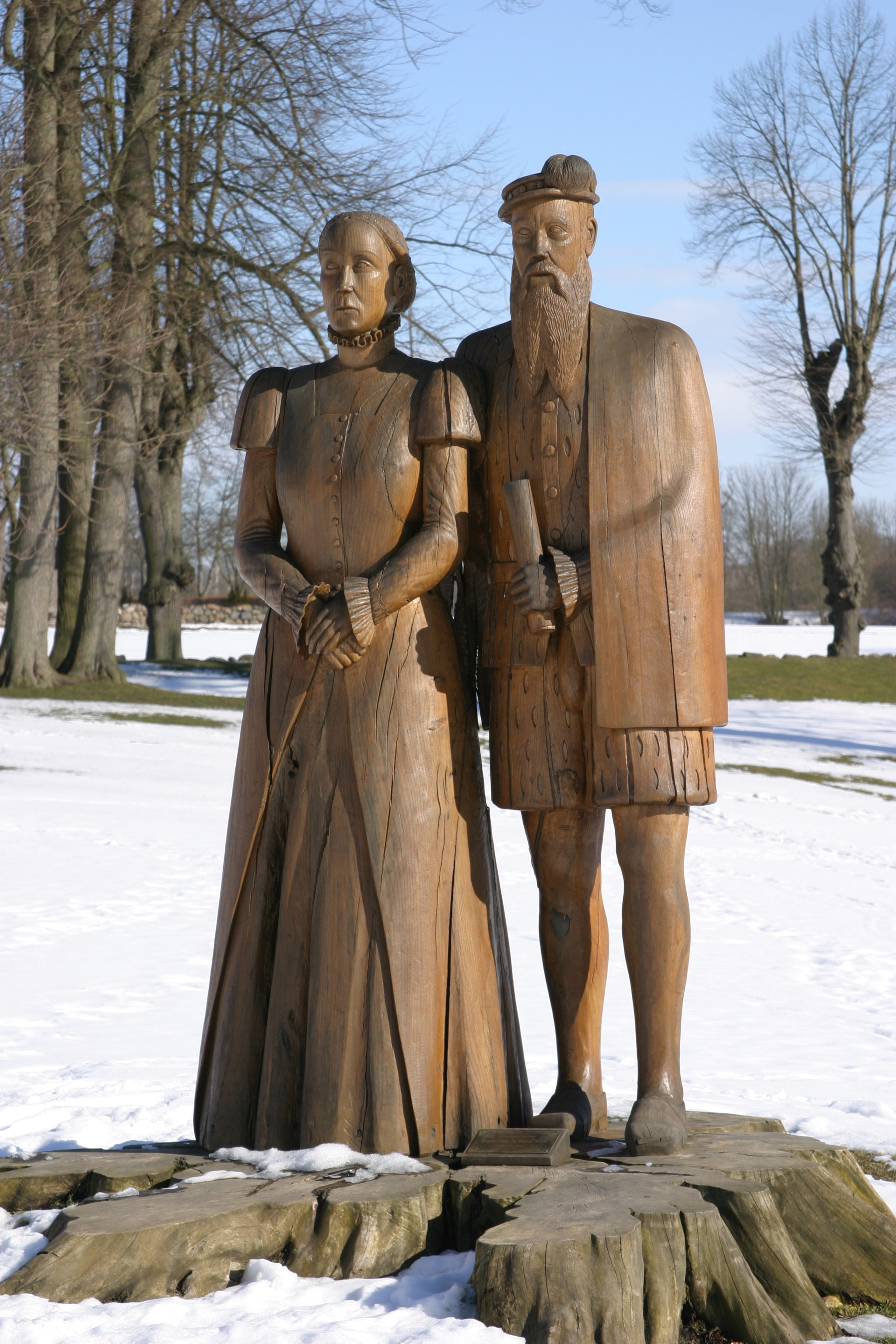
Statue of Herluf Trolle and Birgitte Gøye near Herlufsholm

== Herlufsholm ==
In 1544, Herluf Trolle married Birgitte Gøye. In 1565, they founded Herlufsholm as a boarding school for "sons of noble and other honest men". It was situated on the site of a former Benedictine monastery dating from the 12th century. Herluf Trolle died during 1565 and his wife Birgitte Gøye died during 1574. Both Herluf Trolle and Birgitte Gøye were buried together at Herlufsholm in a tomb made by the Flemish sculptor Cornelis Floris de Vriendt (1514–1575).

== Legacy ==
The street Herluf Trolles Gade in Copenhagen and Herluf Trolle Land are named after him.

A statue of Herluf Trolle and Birgitte Gøye has been installed at Herlufsholm.

== See also ==
- Herluf Trolle Land
