= Oskarström =

- Location within Sweden
- Coordinates: 56°48′5.601″N 12°58′34.503″E
- Country: Sweden
- Province: Halland
- County: Halland County
- Municipality: Halmstad Municipality

Area
  - Total: 3.42 km^{2} (1.32 sq mi)

Population (31 December 2020)
  - Total: 4,157
  - Density: 1,220/km^{2} (3,150/sq mi)
- Time zone: UTC+1 (CET)
  - Summer (DST): UTC+2 (CEST)

Oskarström is the second largest locality in Halmstad Municipality, Halland County, Sweden, with 4,157 inhabitants in 2020. It is situated along the Nissan river about 15 km north-east of Halmstad.

Its name comes from Oscar Björkman from Gothenburg, who in 1844 bought land here and erected a sawmill.

== History ==
=== Prehistory ===
During the Iron Age farming was the main occupation. As evidence of this, there are village grave fields with Iron Age dolmen, a stone circle and a trident. The villages Mared and Espered were probably founded in the early Middle Ages and were approximately equal until the mid-1880s. During the Nordic Seven Years' War (1563–1570) the Swedes, led by commander Charles de Mornay, fought against the forces of Danish King Frederick II at the Battle of Mared, where the present Oskarström is now located. In memory of this the Halland Museum Association erected a memorial stone in 1923.

=== Oskarström Municipal Society ===
In 1885, Oscarström was purchased by Isaac Andrew and Carl Wilhelm Wallberg. They established a hat factory in 1886. In 1888 the factory moved to Wallenberg AB in Halmstad.

In 1890, the Oskar Ströms Jutefabrik started. This was the foundation of the modern village. On January 27, 1905, Oskarström Municipal Society was founded on both sides of the border, between the parishes of Enslöv and Slättåkra. As of May 15, 1936 the town's name was spelled Oskarström. In 1947 it was separated from Enslöv and Slättåkra municipalities and formed Oskarström market town, Halland's first and only market town. The ecclesiastical division between Enslöv and Slättåkra continued until 1957 when Oskarström's congregation was formed. Since 1974, it has been part of the Municipality of Halmstad.

== Sports ==
The local bandy club is called Oskarströms BK and the local football club is called Oskarströms IS. They compete in Swedish Football Division 5.

== Gallery ==
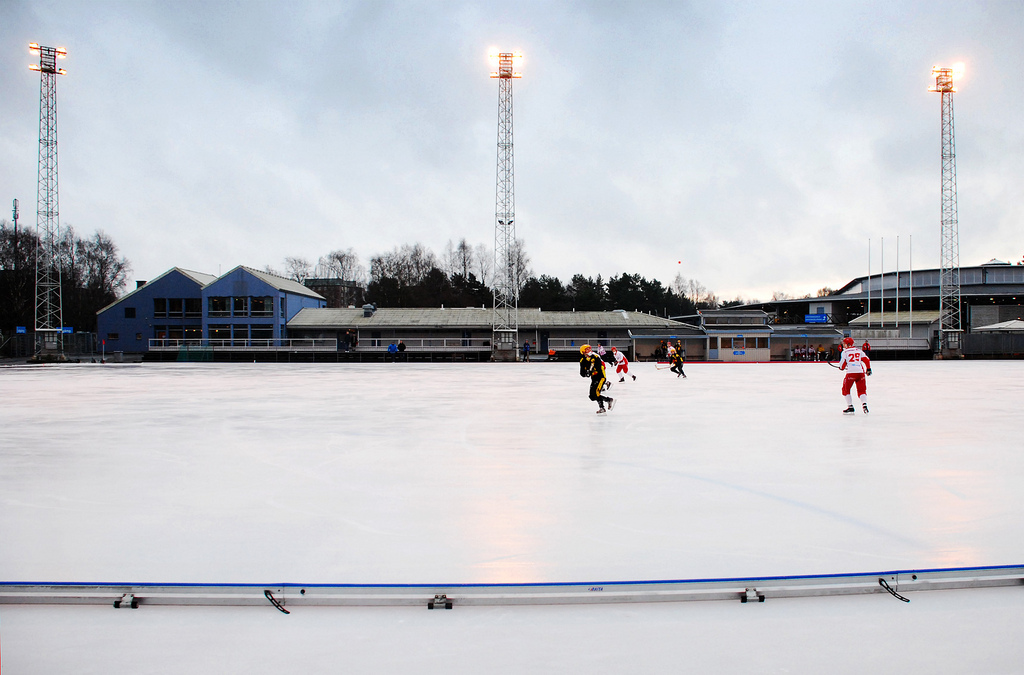
The bandy team playing in Gothenburg

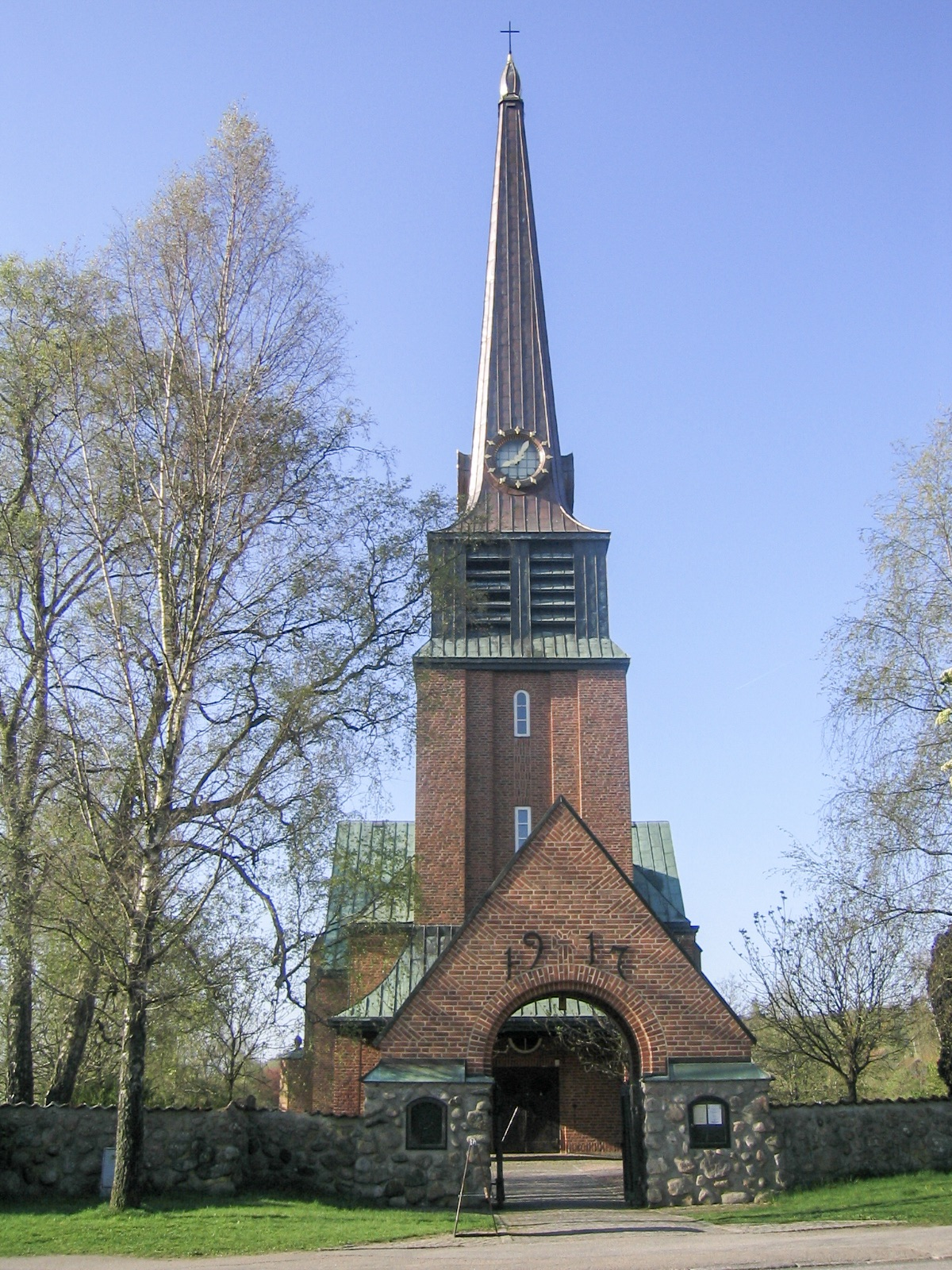
Oskarström's Church
