= Action of 14 August 1564 =

Second battle outside northern Öland
- Part of Northern Seven Years' War
Date	14 August 1564
Location	Northern edge of Öland, Baltic Sea
Result	Swedish victory

Belligerents
Sweden	Denmark–Norway; Lübeck

Commanders and leaders
(Sweden) Klas Kristersson Horn	(Denmark) Herluf Trolle; Friedrich Knebel

Strength
(Sweden) 28 ships	(Denmark) 39 ships

Casualties and losses
Light	3 ships captured 600 men captured

The second Battle outside northern Öland was a sea battle fought during the Northern Seven Years' War between Sweden against Denmark and the Free City of Lübeck, on 14 August 1564. Sweden who suffered one ship (Elefanten) won the battle over the allies whom suffered three captured ships (Böse Lejonet, Morian, David).

== Sources ==
- Unger, Gunnar (1909). Illustrerad svensk sjökrigshistoria: afsedd för undervisningen vid k. sjökrigsskolan. D. 1, Omfattande tiden intill 1680 (in Swedish). Stockholm: Bonnier. SELIBR 648419.
- Glete, Jan (2010). Swedish naval administration, 1521-1721: resource flows and organisational capabilities. The northern world, 1569-1462; 46. Leiden: Brill. p. 153. ISBN 9789004179165. SELIBR 11656061.
