= Naval battle near Hel =

Battle of Hel
Date	July 29, 1571
Location	Off Hel, Baltic Sea
Result	Dano-Norwegian victory

Belligerents
Denmark–Norway	Polish–Lithuanian Commonwealth

Commanders and leaders
Admiral Franke	Krzysztof Minckenbeck

Strength
18 warships	15 warships

Casualties and losses
None	2 warships destroyed 13 warships captured

The Battle of Hel was a naval raid took place on July 29, 1571, when a squadron of the Royal Dano-Norwegian Navy raided the Baltic Sea ports of Puck and Hel, destroying or capturing fifteen ships of the privateer fleet (Polish: Flota kaperska) and Polish and Lithuanian troops of the Polish–Lithuanian Commonwealth, and taking those that were captured back to the city of Copenhagen.

== Background ==
After the conclusion of the Northern Seven Years' War, Polish-Lithuanian and Swedish privateers continued to attack merchant vessels which traded with Tsardom of Russia via the port of Narva. Both the Polish-Lithuanians and the Swedes refrained from direct attacks on Dano-Norwegian fleet, while Denmark-Norway regarded all such raids as piracy. Under the circumstances, Copenhagen decided to undertake activities directed against the Commonwealth.

== Battle ==
In July 1571, a squadron of eighteen Danish ships under a Danish admiral, Franke, entered the waters of the Gdańsk Bay. On July 29 near Hel, the Danes attacked and destroyed two Polish-Lithuanian ships, commanded by Krzysztof Minckenbeck, after which a Danish landing party landed on and penetrated into Hel Peninsula without resistance.

On the same day Dano-Norwegian ships entered the Bay of Puck, where eight Polish-Lithuanian warships plus five captured ships were stationed near the port city of Puck. The Dano-Norwegians broke the resistance of Polish-Lithuanian privateers and captured all thirteen ships, taking them to Copenhagen. As a result of the raid, the Polish–Lithuanian Commonwealth Navy was reduced to half of its previous strength.

== Aftermath ==
In late August 1571, Dano-Norwegian ships once again appeared in the Gdańsk Bay. This time the Polish-Lithuanians had been warned in advance, and all Polish-Lithuanian warships had left Puck, sailing to the city port of Gdańsk, where they found protection. For two weeks the Dano-Norwegian fleet blockaded Gdańsk, demanding that all ships inside Gdańsk be handed over to them. The Gdańsk authorities refused to do so, and to punish the city, a Dano-Norwegian blockade was enacted on the city, and stopped in the Øresund as many as thirty-four merchantmen which were headed for Gdańsk. The Dano-Norwegian victory proved that Polish-Lithuanian privateers, although experienced enough to guard the sea coast, were unable to successfully engage the Royal Dano-Norwegian Navy.

== See also ==
- Battle of Oliwa
- List of naval battles
- History of Poland
