= Friedrich Knebel =

- Born: Wesel
- Died: 15 December 1574; Lübeck
- Allegiance: Free City of Lübeck
- Battles / wars: Northern Seven Years War Battle of Öland (1563) First battle of Öland (1564) Action of 14 August 1564

Friedrich Knebel (died 15 December 1574) was an alderman of the Free City of Lübeck and a naval admiral who participated in the Northern Seven Years War as an ally of Denmark-Norway against Sweden. He commanded the Lübeck fleet at the first battle of Öland in 1564 and the naval battle of 14 August 1564 in the Baltic Sea.

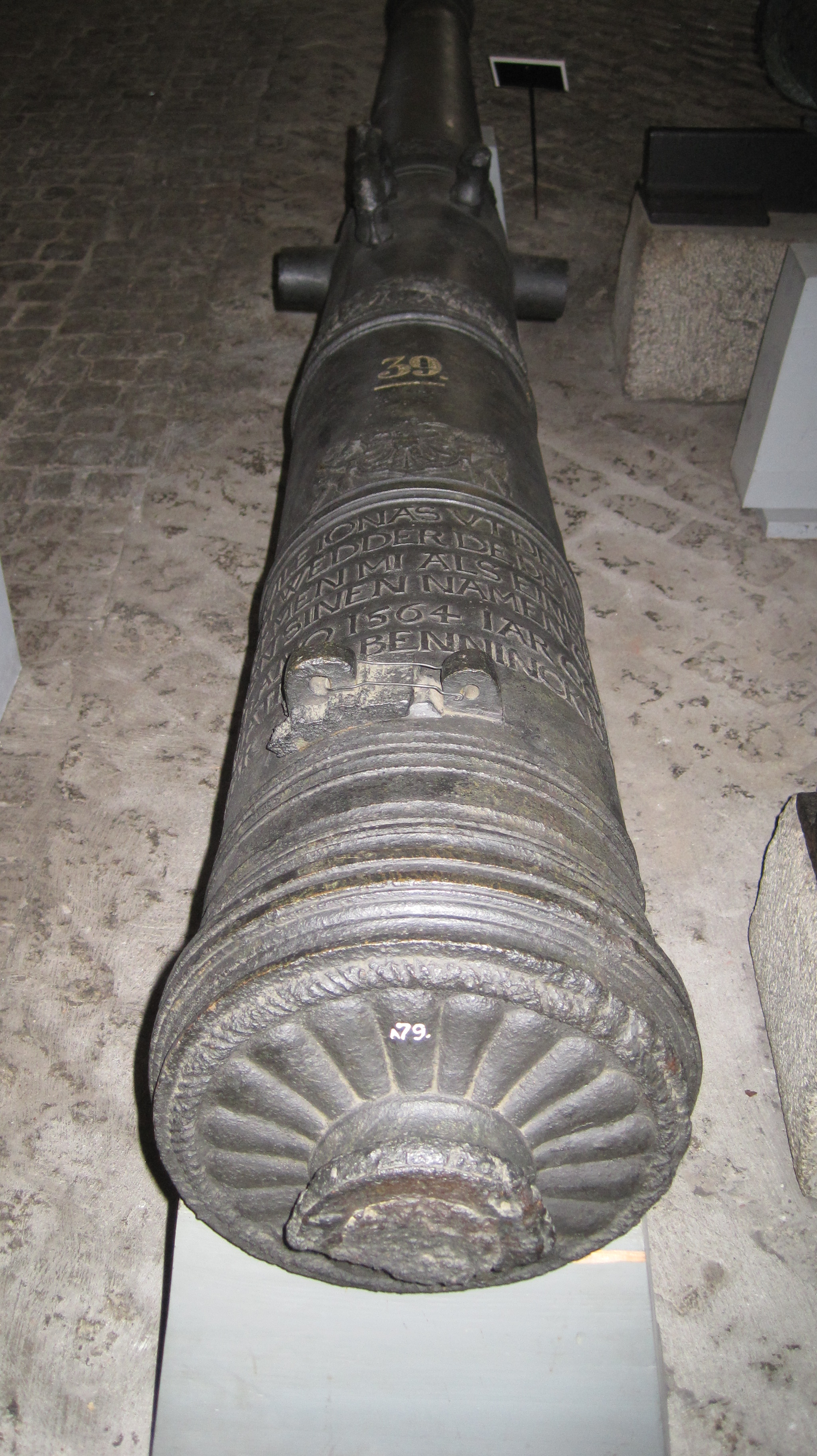
Cannon from Knebel's sunken flagship Engel
