= Battle of Öland (1563) =

1563 battle of the Northern Seven Years' War

- Part of the Northern Seven Years War
Date	September 11, 1563
Location	Öland 56°44′45″N 17°11′14″E
Result	inconclusive

Belligerents
Sweden	Denmark–Norway; Free City of Lübeck

Commanders and leaders
Jakob Bagge	Peder Skram; Friedrich Knebel

Strength
18 ships	34 ships
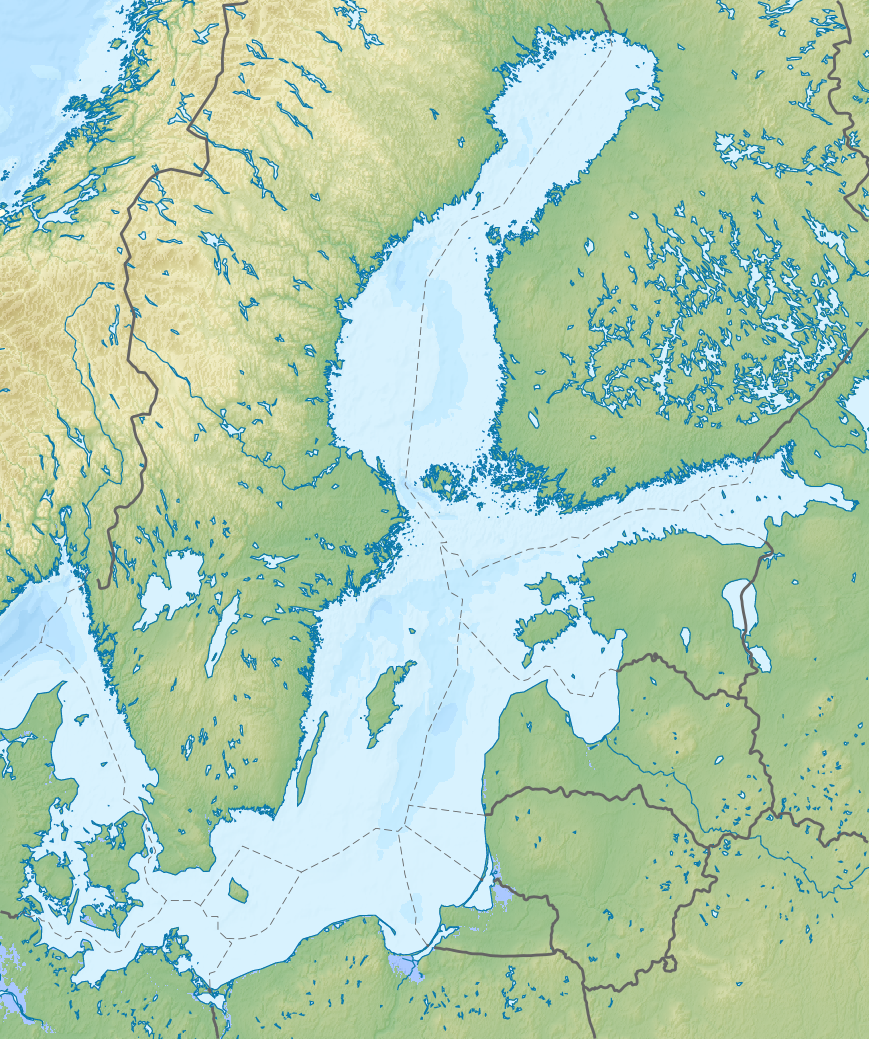
- Location within Sweden Battle of Öland (1563) (Baltic Sea)

The Battle of Öland was a naval battle near the Swedish island of Öland.

== History ==
The engagement took place on September 11, 1563 between a fleet of allied Danish-Lübeck ships and a Swedish fleet of ships. Swedish naval force with 18 ships under the command of Jakob Bagge went out to meet the allied force consisting of 27 Danish ships under Peder Skram and 6 from the Free City of Lübeck under the command of Friedrich Knebel.

== See also ==
- Battle of Öland (1789)

== Other sources ==
- Zettersten, Axel (1903) Svenska flottans historia aren 1635-1680 (Norrtelje : Norrtelje tidnings boktr)
