= Battle of Bornholm (1563) =

First naval battle of the Northern Seven Years' War

- Part of a prelude to the Northern Seven Years' War
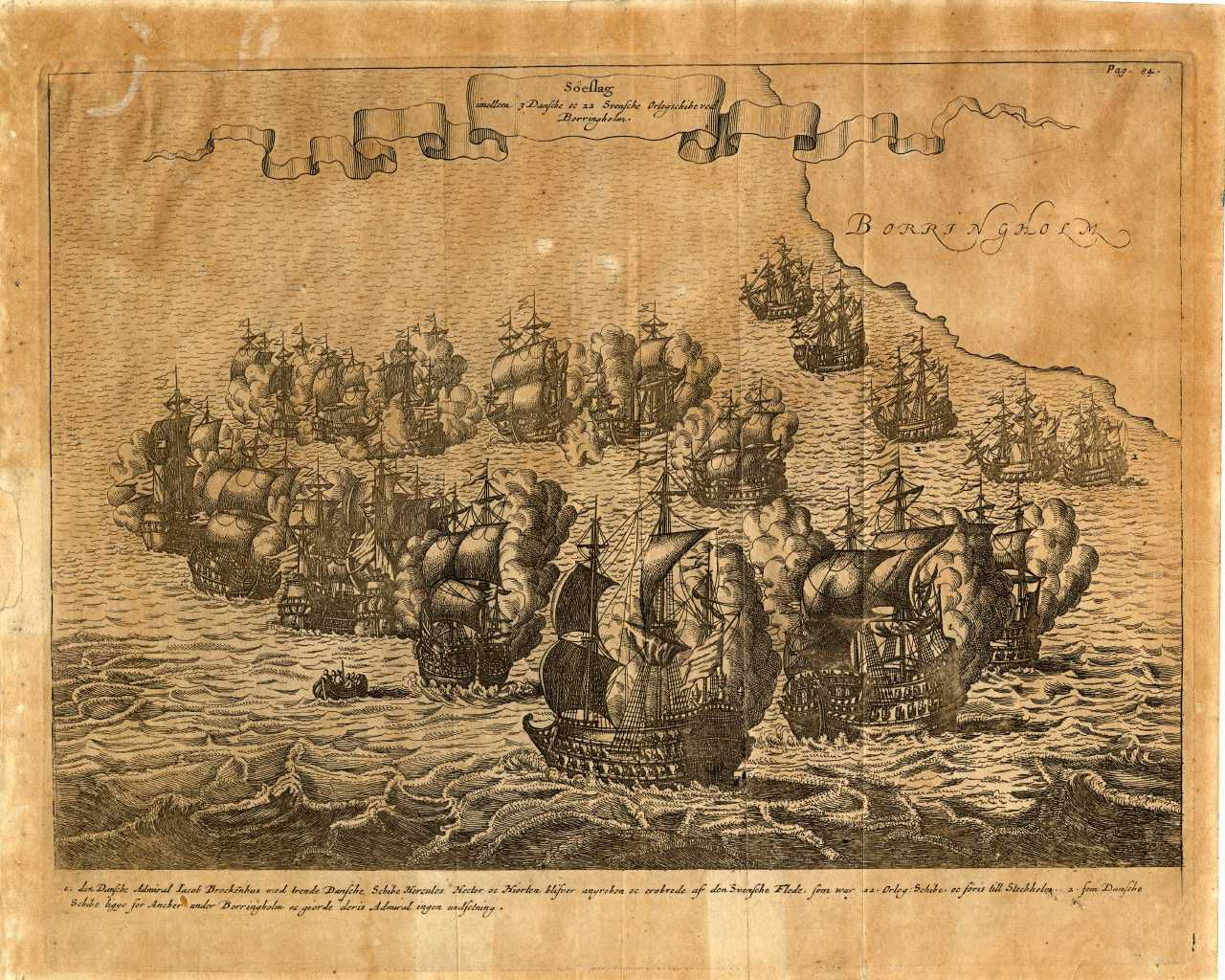
- Naval battles of the Northern War: Battle of Bornholm (1563)
Date	30 May 1563
Location	Off Bornholm, Denmark
Result	Swedish victory

Belligerents
Sweden	Denmark–Norway

Commanders and leaders
(History of Sweden (1523–1611)) Jakob Bagge	(Denmark–Norway) Jacob Brockenhuus (POW)

Units involved
Unknown	(Denmark–Norway) Hercules (Denmark–Norway) Hector (Denmark–Norway) Hjort

Strength
19 ships	3 ships

Casualties and losses
Negligible	3 ships captured 800 men captured

The Battle of Bornholm (1563) was the naval battle that would eventually lead to the outbreak of the Northern Seven Years' War

== Background ==
In early 1563, 20 years after the Dacke War, the Swedish admiral Jakob Bagge was a 60 year old veteran. Eric XIV ordered him to provoke the Danes near Gotland or Bornholm and get them to attack the Swedish fleet, so that war on Denmark could be declared on the pretext of self-defense. For this reason, Bagge ordered the crew on the Swedish ships not to strike the top sail on their ships which was a normal practice to show respect.

Bagge hoped this would be insulting enough for the Danes to attack. If events would proceed like Eric had planned, all of Europe would hear how Danish ships attacked the "poor Swedish ships who were just on the way to transport a wife for their king"

=== Prelude ===
On 30 May, the Swedes set sail for Bornholm, they could have avoided the island entirely, as they were going to Rostock, but instead, they went as close as possible to Hammershus fortress and the harbor in Rönne. When they came in hearing distance, they fired two shots, which signalled that the ships were Swedish. In Hammershus, the Lübeckian chief Schweder Kettingk and his men were stationed there, however, in Rönne's harbour, there were several Danish warships. The harbor had been created as a temporary base for the Danish navy. King Frederick had previously given out an order saying that the Danish navy was to patrol the Baltic Sea and visit all Swedish ships that were encountered. If they found cargo ships with food or war material the cargo was to be confiscated.

The Danes held deep mistrust for the Swedes, and when the Danes first heard the two shots from the Swedish ships, three Danish warships were dispatched to meet the Swedes, one of these being the flagship Herkules with the admiral Jacob Brockenhuus onboard.

There was also a Hessian delegation on the Swedish flagship, of which none knew of the true Swedish intentions. The atmosphere onboard was lively, with music playing. The crew's attention was not directed towards the three Danish warships that were quickly approaching. After the Danish ships had come closer, three shots were fired, signalling that the ships were Danish, after this signal, the events that followed are disputed.

According to Danish sources, the Danes fired three blanks to warn the Swedes of their presence and to allow the crew onboard to show their good will. After which they fired a live round which penetrated the sail of the Elefanten. According to Swedish sources, the Danes only fired 2 blank rounds, with the third one being a live round which gave Bagge a reason to fire back at the Danes.

== Battle ==
Blood flag

On the stern of the Elefanten, the "blood flag" was raised, which signalled the other ships that the sea battle was to begin. The Swedes did not spare any of their gunpowder, the hole in the Elefanten's sail was compensated for in the ensuing battle, which lasted several hours. Almost immediately, a Swedish cannonball hit the mainmast of the Herkules, which fell down and landed in the middle of the firing line for the men onboard, while the Danes were removing the mast, the Swedes continued shooting at the ship, causing heavy casualties. The Danes, who were aware of the possibility that fighting would break out, were taken by surprise by the Swedes.

The small group of three Danish ships that had sailed from Rönne were only intended to control the waters and make sure the Swedes respected their neighbours, and not for a large sea battle. It is likely that the Danes wanted to go onboard the Swedish ships to make sure everything was as it was supposed to be. The remaining Danish ships in Rönne did not come to help Admiral Jacob Brockenhuus, instead, they stayed at a safe distance and did not participate in the battle. As a result of their inferior numbers, the Danes suffered a crushing defeat, and when Brockenhuus realized that the remaining Danish ships would be destroyed he surrendered to the Swedes.

== Aftermath ==
After the battle, having lured the Danes into his trap, Jacob Bagges mission was completed. As a consequence, Frederick and the Danish fleet were seen as the aggressors, and when the war broke out, Eric hoped that the entire world would "pour sympathy" for him.

== Other Sources ==
- Sundberg, Ulf (1998) Svenska krig 1521-1814 (Hjalmarson & Högberg) ISBN 9189080149
- Stiles, Andrina (1992) Sweden and the Baltic, 1523 - 1721 (Hodder & Stoughton) ISBN 0-340-54644-1
- Frost, Robert I. (2000) The Northern Wars, 1558-1721(Longman, Harlow) ISBN 0-582-06429-5
