= Herlufsholm School =

Coordinates: 55°14′45″N 11°44′55″E

- Herlufsholm Skole og Gods
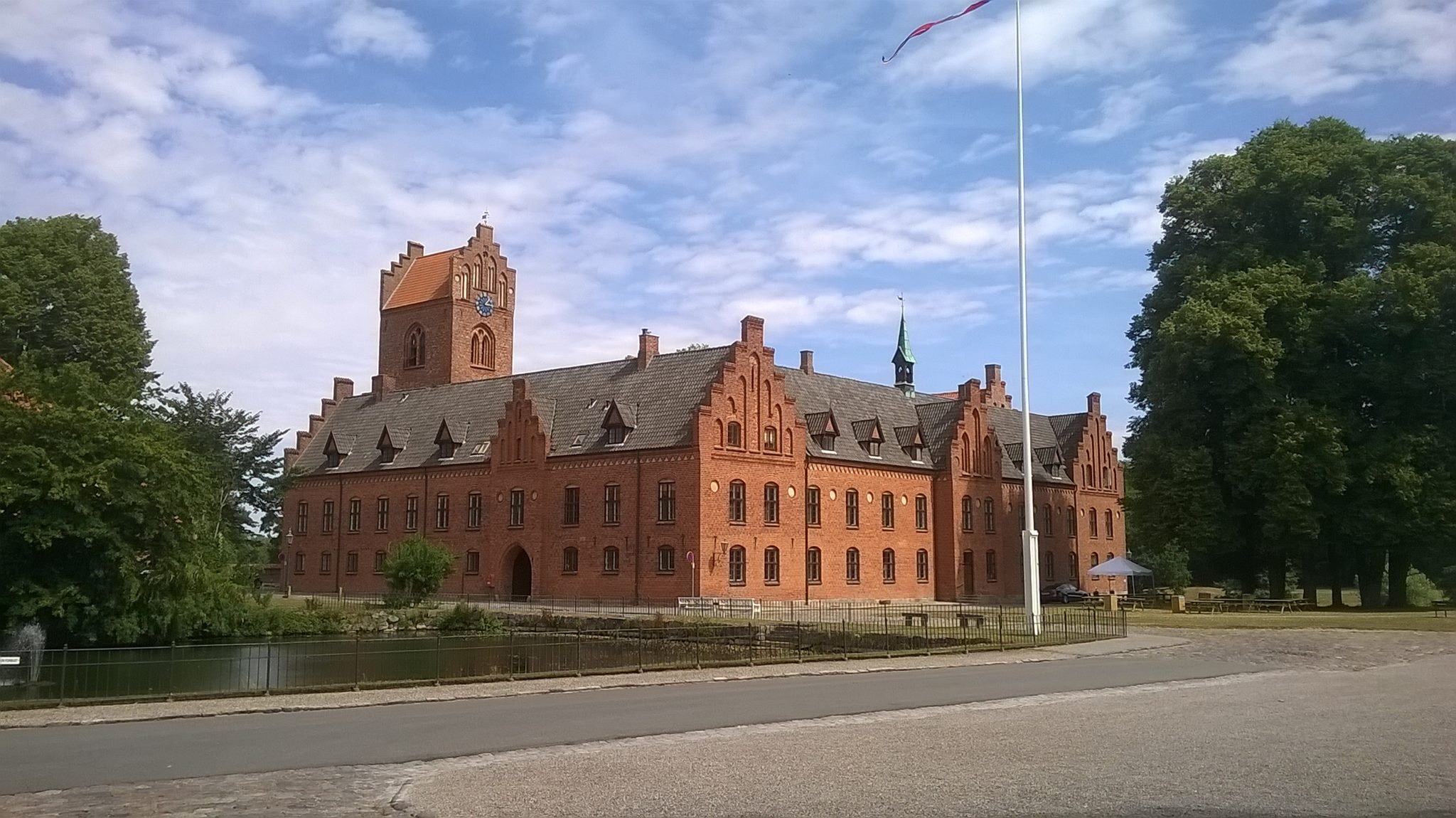
- Herlufsholm School in 2014.

Location
- Herlufsholm Allé 170; Næstved; Denmark

Information
- Type: Private School
- Established: 1565; 461 years ago
- Founder: Herluf Trolle & Birgitte Gøye
- Headmaster: vacant
- Grades: 6th to 12th
- Gender: Mixed
- Enrollment: 600 (approx.)
- Houses: Mygningen, Vest, Øst, Vuen, Lassen, Egmont, Pernille Gøye, Birgitte Gøye, Bodil
- Colours: Blue & White (GØY family); Red & Gold (Trolle family)
- Yearbook: Diple og Hørere
- Website: Official Website

Herlufsholm School (Danish: Herlufsholm Skole og Gods) is a private day and boarding school by the River Suså in Næstved, about 80 kilometers (50 mi) south of Copenhagen. Herlufsholm was founded in 1565 as a boarding school for "sons of noble and other honest men" on the site of a former Benedictine monastery from the 12th century.

Herlufsholm has been co-educational since the 1960s for day students, as of 1985 for boarding pupils. The student body currently exceeds 600 students, of which approximately 275 students are boarders who live in the dormitories. The pupils follow a 10-day programme with lessons on Saturdays followed by 3-day weekends. The school offers a range of education: from 6th grade in the Danish lower-secondary school; the optional 10th grade; the three grades in upper-secondary school and the international programs: a preparatory class (1–2 year) with IGCSE exams and the International Baccalaureate Programme.

== The founding of the school ==
Herlufsholm is built on the site of a Benedictine monastery, founded in 1135, of which the church and a few other remnants are preserved and in daily use by the students and staff. The monastery was originally called Sct. Peder's Monastery, but over the years it became known as Skovkloster. It was seized by King Christian III of Denmark during the Reformation in Denmark–Norway and Holstein in 1536. The king allowed the monks to remain, and the last monk left the monastery in 1559 in favour of another monastery in the close by city of Sorø.

Danish naval officer and hero, Admiral of the Fleet Herluf Trolle (1516–1565) and his wife Birgitte Gøye (1511–1574) took possession of the monastery in 1560 in exchange of their home Hillerødsholm (which later became Frederiksborg Palace). The couple changed the name into Herlufsholm and founded the school in May 1565, but Herluf Trolle never saw their dream materialise because he was fatally wounded on sea; he died in Copenhagen in June 1565.

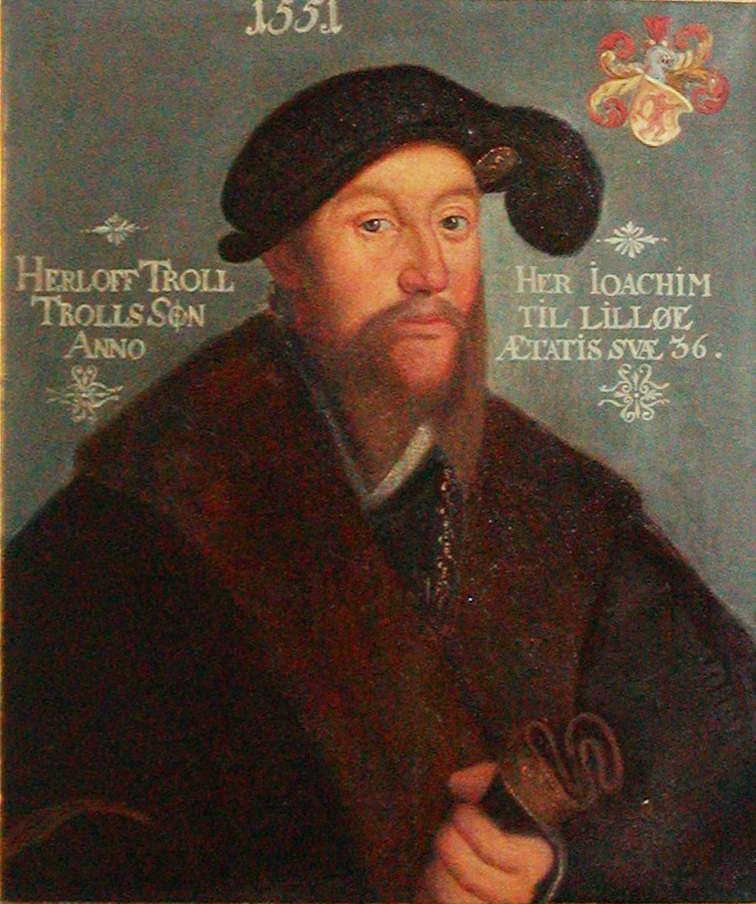
Herluf Trolle (1551), Collections of Frederiksborg castle

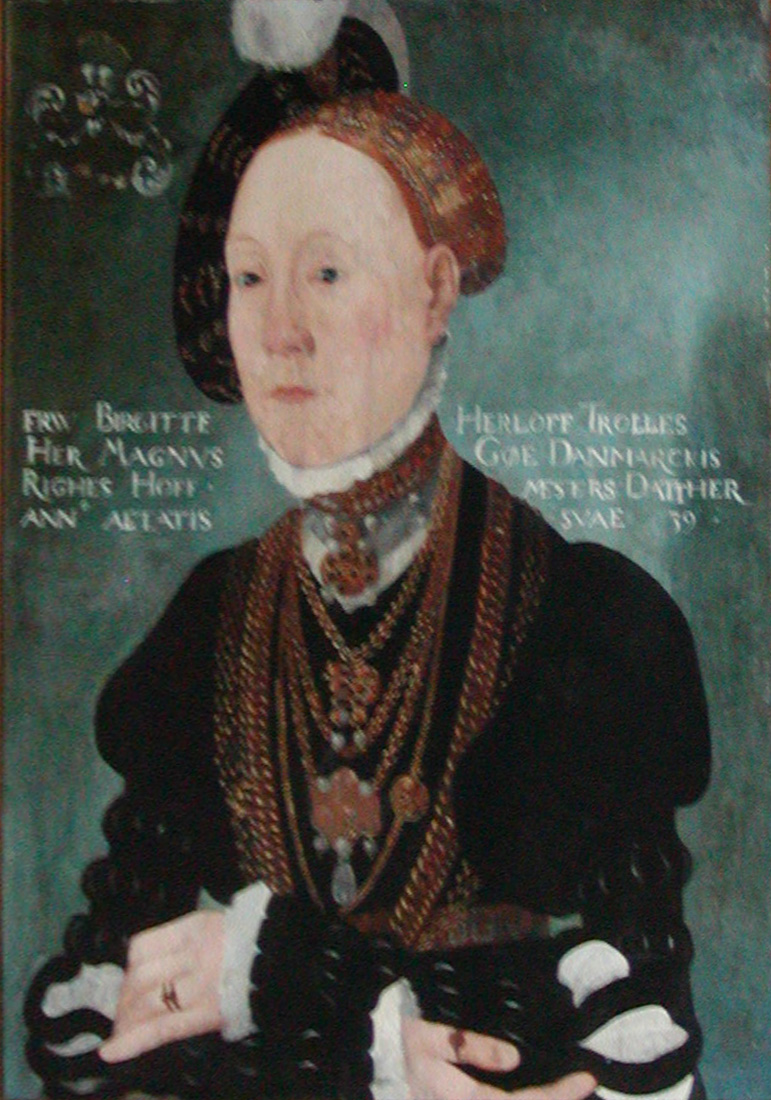
Birgitte Gøye (1550), Frederiksborg collections

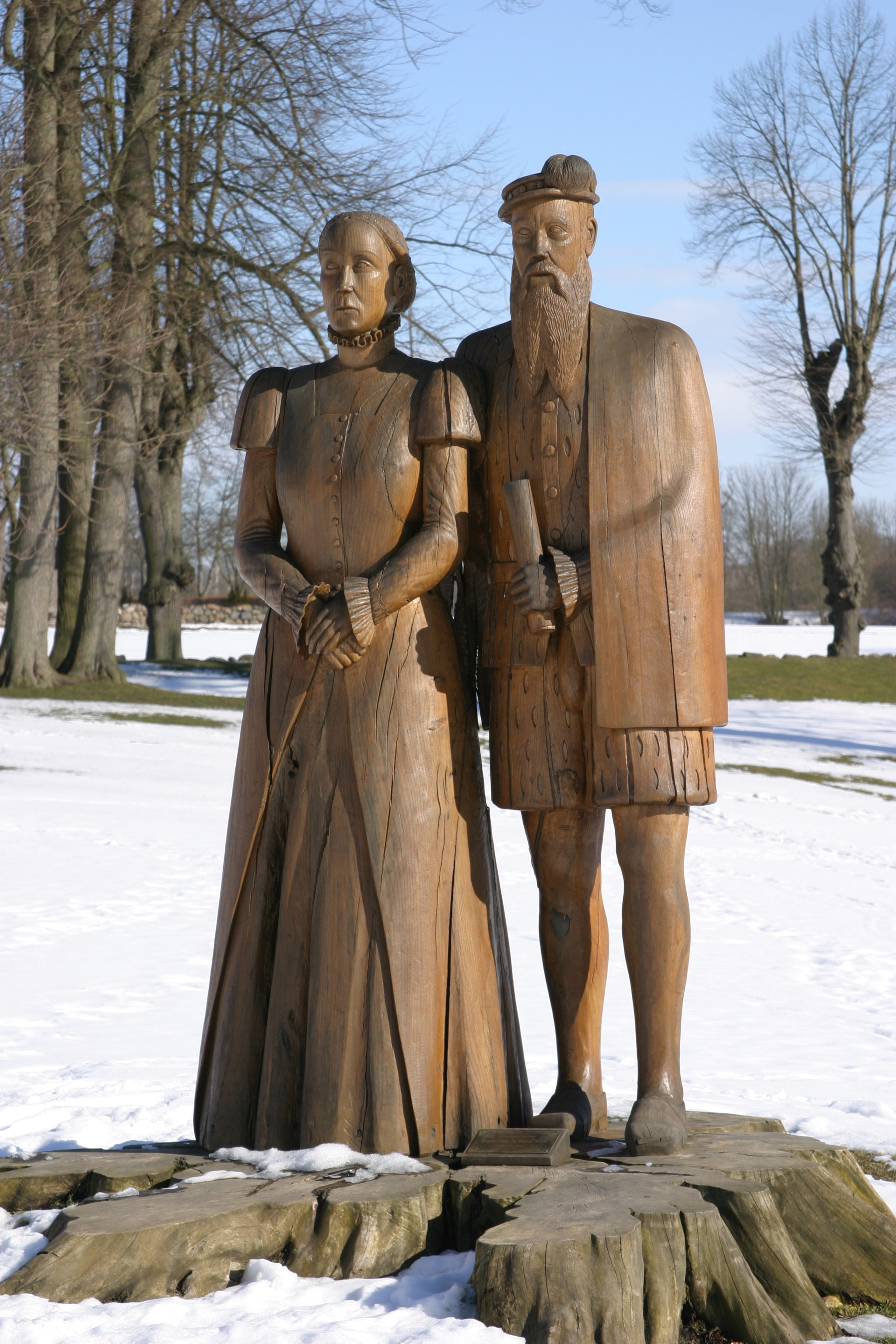
Herluf Trolle and Birgitte Gøye carved in wood

== School buildings ==
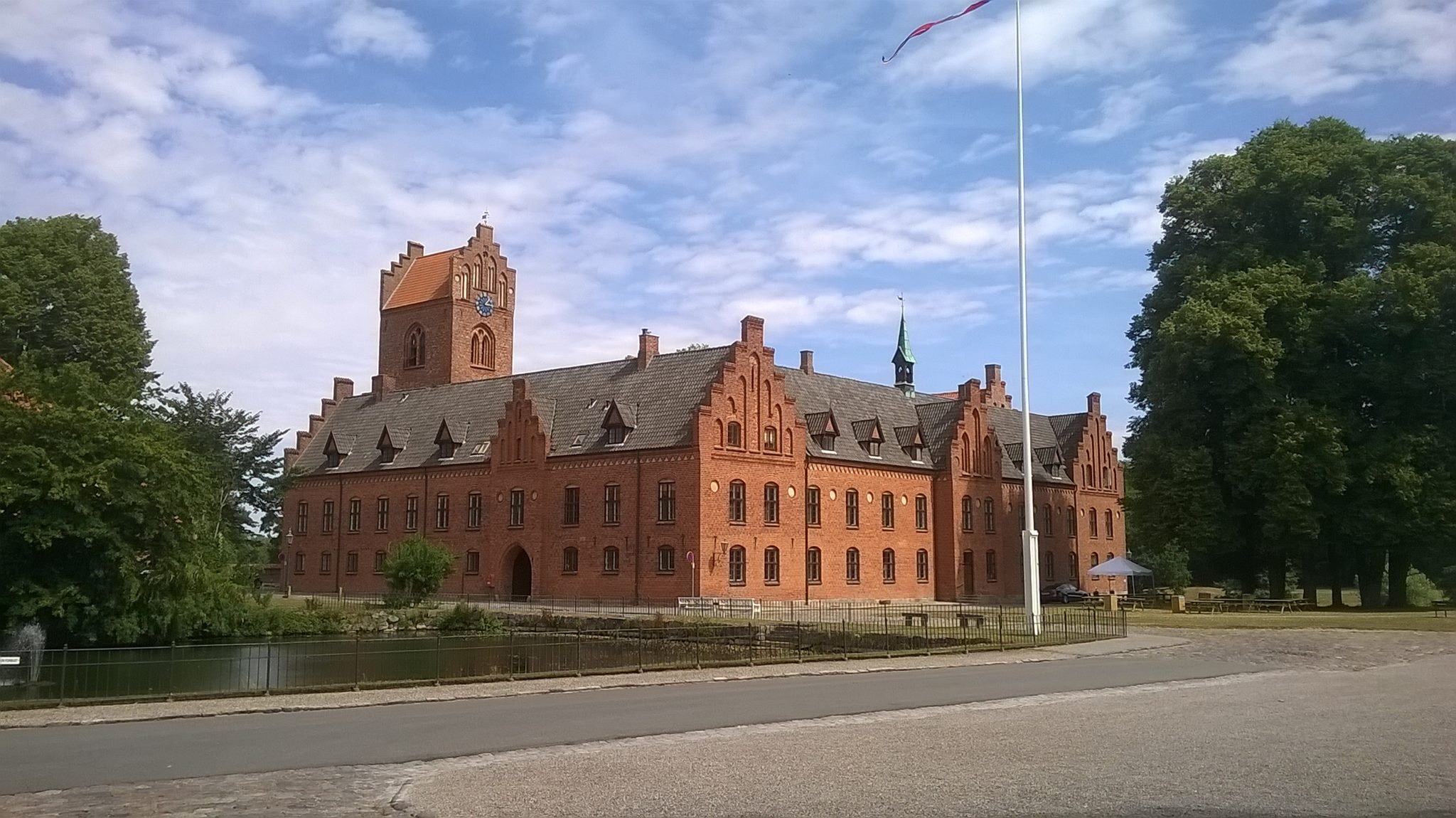
Klosterbygningen, the main building of Herlufsholm

Herlufsholm has evolved over a couple of centuries, with many characteristic changes in the past 50 years. The school campus still retains a Gothic appearance thanks to the former abbey church and the adjoining building, Klosterbygningen ("Monastery Building"), of which the only original part remaining is the cellars – the present building is from the 1870s. Klosterbygningen consists of the church (in which the students gather in the morning), two dining halls, a ballroom, the provost apartment, music studies, washing facilities and other amenities.

The second largest building is Skolebygningen ("School Building") which contains two dormitories and some classrooms. Up until the middle of the 20th century most of the teaching took place here, but now less than half the school's classrooms are located here.

The third most important building is Museumsbygningen ("Museum Building"), which contains another two dormitories, the science department, the biology department and the school's collection of historical scientific apparatus and specimens of animal species, many now endangered, in a collection dating back to the 1870s.

The campus also holds a library from 1911, a small hospital, the principal's house, a few house for teachers and various other service and administrative buildings.

The rest of the classrooms are located in Gymnasiefløjen where the teaching of the secondary school pupils takes place. The Gymnasium Building is connected to the principal's office, the staffroom and Helenhallen, which is the second largest gym, also containing a stage.

The 10 school houses are:

- Mygningen 1st
- Mygningen 2nd
- Skygningen, East
- Skygningen, West
- Vuggestuen (Vuen)
- Lassengården
- Egmontgården
- Birgitte Gøye-gården (BG)
- Pernille Gøye-gården (PG)
- Bodil-Gården

The newest dormitory Bodil-Gården finished construction in 2010, houses the youngest boarding pupils, and is one of the three mixed-gender dorms along with Lassengården and Vuggestuen.

== Traditions ==
Because of its origin as a monastery, the pupils are referred to internally as disciples; but they are also called Herlovianere (Herlovians) and former students are thereby Gammelherlovianere (Old Herlovians). The members of teaching staff go by the name "hører" which is Danish for "hearer" and many of them gain nicknames that some even go by in the classrooms. The headmaster and his wife are known as "Heis and Mia" respectively. A number of senior year students are appointed prefects in every house.

A day at Herlufsholm is structured around the three daily meals, school before and after midday, and the private 2 hour study session on either side of the evening dinner; boarding students furthermore have specific timings for going to bed depending on their year. Every morning after the first session of lectures, the school gathers in the church or the gym hall to get an update on current matters of interest and sing from their personal songbooks.

=== The uniform ===
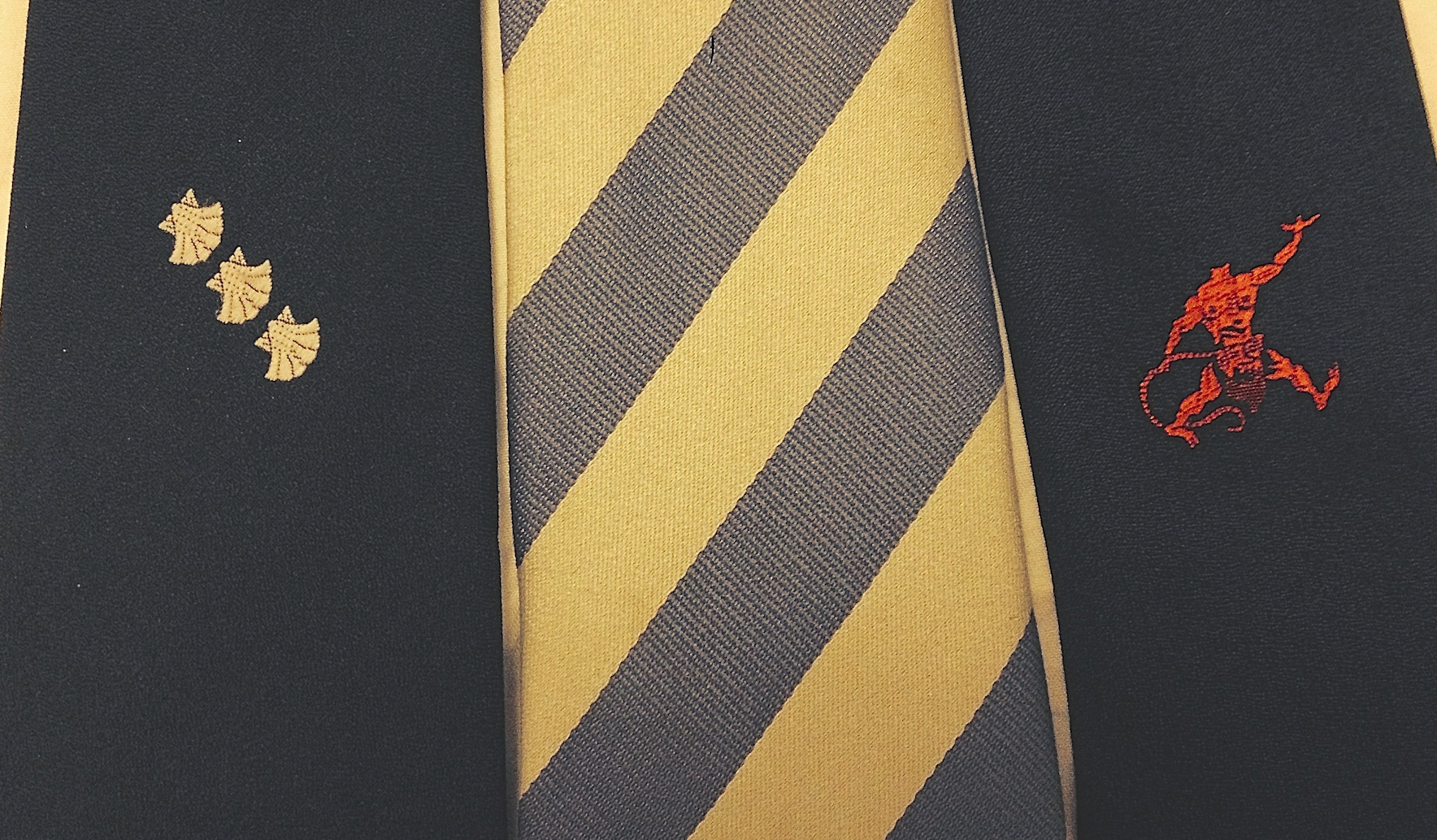
The three school ties

Herlufsholm is the only school in Denmark with a compulsory uniform. Every student for 6th to 12th grade, boarding and day students, must wear the uniform in school - except at gym class where a sports uniform is used. The school has two uniform systems: Half and Full Galla.

Students are required to wear jackets on special occasions, e.g. exams and traditional festivities, but many choose to do so on other days as well for practical reasons such as cold weather. Students in middle-school, 6th-9th, wear a double-buttoned blazer, while students in the preparatory class (10th grade) as well as all high school students wear the single-row, school blazer with the Gøye arms on the chest.

All students have to buy the two school ties, which they are obliged to wear with their blazer. The "Herlovianerslips" (Herlovian Tie) is coloured in blue and silver/white diagonal stripes running down the tie from the wearer's left. The "Gøyeslips" (Gøye Tie) is full coloured, dark blue tie with the Gøye family crest, three pilgrims' scallops. Previously, there existed a corresponding "Trolleslips" (Trolle Tie) with the Trolle family crest, a beheaded, red troll; but it has gone out of production for reasons unknown.

==== Half Galla ====
Half Galla is the ordinary day uniform, dating back to the 1950s, used in school as well as less formal festivities. The uniform is centered on a sky blue, button-down shirt with the Gøye family crest on the chest pocket. Students are free to combine this shirt with charcoal-grey or blue pants/skirts and pullovers - light colour variations are banned and so is black. Though, denim is not accepted in class, the students are otherwise free to wear clothes of their liking as long as it is without large prints, patterns and logos. Furthermore, students are allowed to wear classic coats, sensible black footwear and inconspicuous belts.

The correct half galla, consists of the Herlovianerslips on the blue school shirt, charcoal grey pants and school blazer. This uniform is for instance used at the Fugleskydning and final exams.

In their senior year, corresponding to 12th grade, male students wear a peaked cap with a pilgrims' scallop on oak leaves, and white pants as was previously tradition among senior navy cadets. Female students wear a dark blue sailor hat made of straw with a white band and tails, and a white, high waisted, floor-length dress with pleats and gold buttons. Prefects, all senior year, wear the Trolle crest instead of the Gøye shield worn by the rest of the school.

==== Full Galla ====
Full Galla is the uniform used in festivities and solemnity. The correct full galla, consists of a dark blue, double-breasted suit or with a comely skirt, and the Gøyeslips on a white shirt. This uniform is used at the Trollemorgen and formal school dinner parties, where the tie is replaced with a bowtie for boys; or as a whole for girls who wear galla dresses. In their senior year, male students often wear a white bowtie, especially at graduation where the white corresponds nicely with the Danish student cap.

=== Herlovianersproget ===
A unique characteristic of the school is that the students have developed their own language called the herlovianersprog. Words are created by simply taking the first and last syllables of a word and making a portmanteau of the two. So for instance, skolebygning ("school building") becomes skygning. These words are not exclusive to Danish, with the English word sroom stemming from sleeping room.

Even though the language is exclusively used at Herlufsholm, some words have been adopted into Danish. For instance "svælling" (cygnet), which had not previously featured as a word in Danish, is originally Herlovian for Svane + Ælling (Swan + duckling). So far two dictionaries have been published.

== Evidence of abuse ==
A May 2022 TV 2 documentary revealed evidence, including testimony and video, of a culture of bullying and sexual abuse directed at young students; the documentary provoked an emotional reaction in Denmark. In response, Education Minister Pernille Rosenkrantz-Theil was summoned to a closed session of parliament, and the school's board sacked its principal and abolished the prefect system. The entire board resigned the following month after sanctions and strong criticism from Denmark's National Agency for Education and Quality. The Danish royal family also announced that they were withdrawing Crown Prince Christian from the school.

== Notable alumni ==
=== Academia ===
- Jákup Jakobsen – Faroese linguist and scholar
- Knud Lyne Rahbek – Danish literary historian, critic, writer, poet and magazine editor (1760–1830)
- Niels Ryberg Finsen – Faroese physician and Nobel laureate (1860–1904)

=== Arts and culture ===
- Johan Philip Asbæk – Danish actor (born 1982)
- Pilou Asbæk – Danish actor (born 1982)
- Jens Fink-Jensen – Danish writer, photographer, composer and architect (born 1956)
- Nicolai Frahm – British art gallery, closed in 2014
- Sven Holm – Danish author and playwright (1940–2019)
- Kristian von Hornsleth – Danish conceptual artist (born 1963)
- Marie Tetzlaff

=== Government and politics ===
- Christian Albrecht Bluhme – Danish lawyer and prime minister
- Bernt Johan Collet – Danish politician and farmer
- Joachim Gersdorff – Danish politician
- Marcus Knuth – Danish politician (born 1976)
- Hannibal Sehested (council president) – Danish landowner and Council President (1842-1924)
- Knud Sehested
- Niels Trolle – Danish nobleman (1599–1667)
- Corfitz Ulfeld – Danish statesman (1606–1664)

=== Military ===
- Søren Haslund-Christensen
- Anders Lassen – Danish military officer (1920–1945)

=== Others ===
- Christian, Crown Prince of Denmark – Heir apparent to the Danish throne (born 2005)
- Frederik Harhoff – Danish jurist (born 1949)
- Michael Møller – Danish diplomat
- Count Nikolai of Monpezat – Member of the Danish royal family (born 1999)
- Peter Sisseck – Spanish winery in Valladolid
- Christian Stadil – Danish executive and chairman

== See also ==
- Herlufsholm Strand
