= First Battle of Öland =

1564 battle

First Battle of Öland (1564)
- Part of Northern Seven Years' War
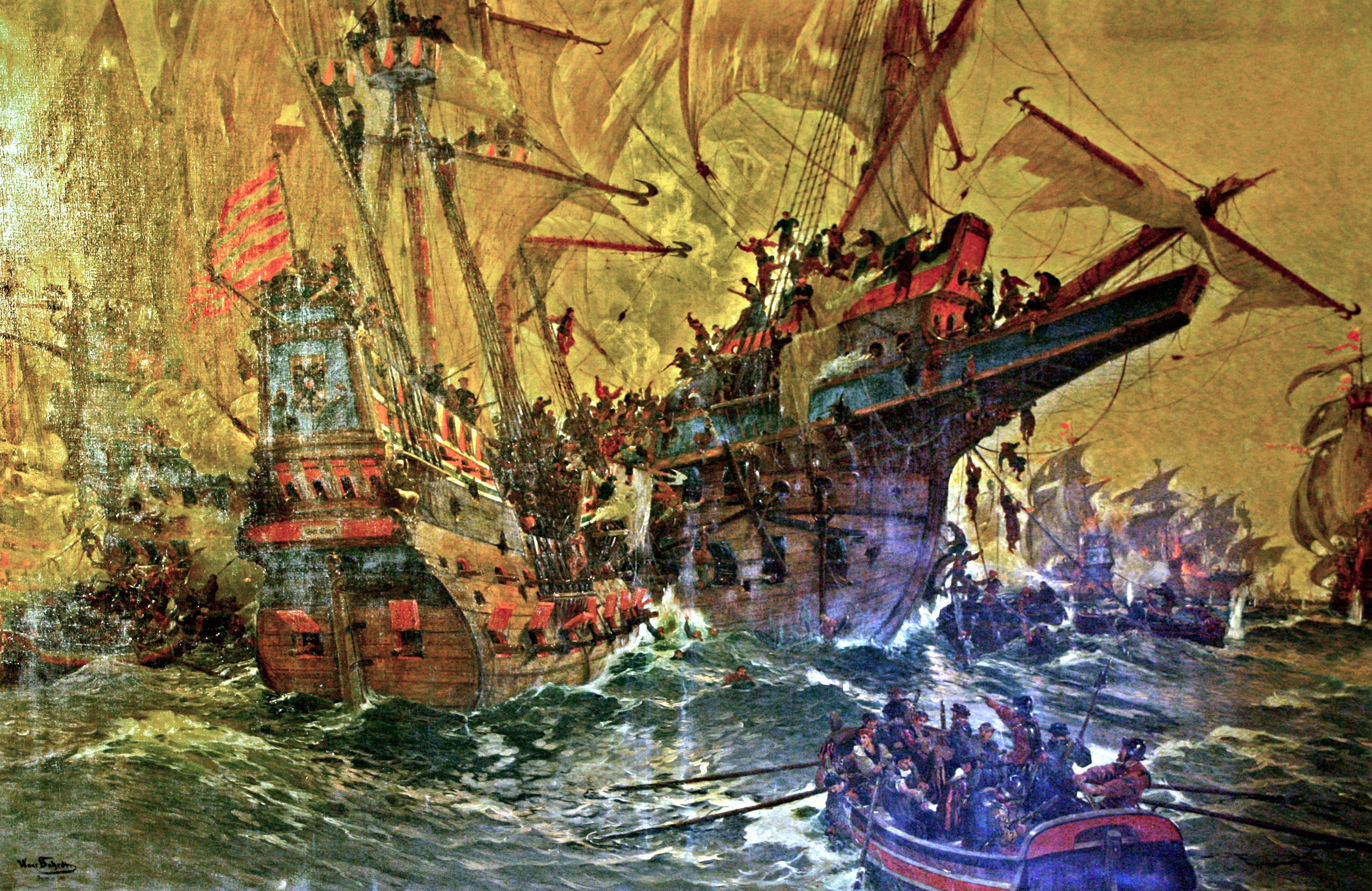
- Final battle at Mars, by Hans Bohrdt
Date	30–31 May 1564
Location	Between Gotland and Öland, Baltic Sea 57°20′N 17°15′E
Result	Dano-Lübeckian victory

Belligerents
Sweden	Denmark; Lübeck

Commanders and leaders
(Sweden) Jakob Bagge	(Denmark) Herluf Trolle; Friedrich Knebel

Strength
(Sweden) 35 vessels, 3,500 sailors (Sweden) 1,700 soldiers	(Denmark) 26 ships, 4,600 sailors 10 ships, 2,018 sailors

Casualties and losses
(Sweden) 1 ship, flagship Mars with approximately 800 sailors, additionally 101 sailors were killed on other ships	1 ship, Lange Bark sunk on the 30th losses unknown, and approximately 300 boarders on the Mars

The First Battle of Öland (Swedish: Första slaget vid Ölands norra udde), was part of the Nordic Seven Years War (1563-1570), which broke out as a result of King Erik XIV’s claim for dominion over the Baltic Sea, which "challenged the trade interests of both Denmark and the Hanseatic city of Lubeck". It took place on 30–31 May 1564 between the islands of Gotland and Öland, off the northern tip of Öland, between a Dano-Lübeckian fleet of 36 ships, the Danes under Herluf Trolle and the Lübeckers under Friedrich Knebel, and a Swedish fleet of 38 ships under Admiral Jakob Bagge. It was a Dano-Lübeckian victory.

Only some of the ships on each side were involved, the rest being unable to join or continue their part in the battle due to the wind. On 30 May, Danish flagship Fortuna was damaged and Lange Bark (in Swedish sources called Lange barken) were sunk by the Swedish ship Mars. On the second day of the battle, the Mars was attacked with incendiaries and boarded by Byens Løffue, Engel, and Fuchs. The fire reached the powder magazine and the ship exploded, killing most of its crew and 300 boarders. Jakob Bagge and his Second, Arved Trolle, were taken prisoner. Swedish casualties apart from in this ship were 101. Fleming took over the fleet and sailed it back to Älvsnabben to make repairs, while the Danes sailed to Copenhagen. The Swedish navy returned to battle in July.

== Ships involved ==
=== Denmark/Lübeck ===
- Fortuna (Danish flag)
- Byens Løffue 56
- Engel (Lübeck flag)
- Lange Bark (Lübeck) — sunk 30 May
- Arck
- Fuchs (Lübeck)
- other ships

=== Sweden ===
- Mars 173 (flag) — blew up 31 May
  - The flagship of the Swedish fleet, Swedish battleship Mars (also known as the Makalos [Matchless] or the Jutehatar), the largest in the Baltic at the time at more than 45m long and carrying 173 guns (some sources debate between 100-200), was constructed from 1561-1564, under instruction from master shipwright Holgerd Olsson (Master Hollinger). This new immense construction was indicative of King Erik XIV's push to build a stronger navy to strengthen Sweden's economy by taxing foreign ships, as part of his attempt to increase Sweden's position and the legitimacy of his own dynasty, which was at the time contested.
  - Mars is an early example of carvel construction and contains some unique elements. "One peculiarity is the battens that are placed over the seams on the inside of the planking to hold the caulking in place.” "Two rows of gun-ports reveal that Mars had two nearly complete gun-decks running from stem to stern, which makes Mars a two- decker.”
  - At this time, medieval wrought-iron breech-loaded guns were being gradually replaced by cast-bronze muzzle-loaded guns. Indicative of this transition, the Mars had 112 bronze guns as well as four wrought-iron pieces. Uniquely, "all gun carriages aboard Mars appear to be of a two- wheeled type, which is commonly associated with ﬁeld artillery".
  - The remains of the shipwreck were discovered in 2011: “The forward portion of the hull was nearly destroyed. What remains of the heavily framed ship is broken up into three more- or-less coherent parts, consisting of the lower hull, the starboard side and the port side (Fig. 5). Survey results suggest that the hull broke into these three pieces while it was still on the surface."
- Elefant 65 (Fleming)
- Finska Svan 82
- Svenska Hektor 87
- 19 or more other ships

== Tactics ==
"The 1500s were a period of transition for naval warfare. Boarding tactics, where warring ships came together to enable man-to- man ﬁghting, were slowly replaced by regular artillery battles, where ships ﬁred on each other from a distance. The events of Öland in the spring of 1564 are illustrative of this transition."

In accordance with this, "Mars carried heavy artillery on the lower deck, but was also equipped with a high, carrack- type sterncastle of a type associated with medieval boarding tactics."
