= Birgitte Gøye =

Danish county administrator, lady in waiting, landholder and noble

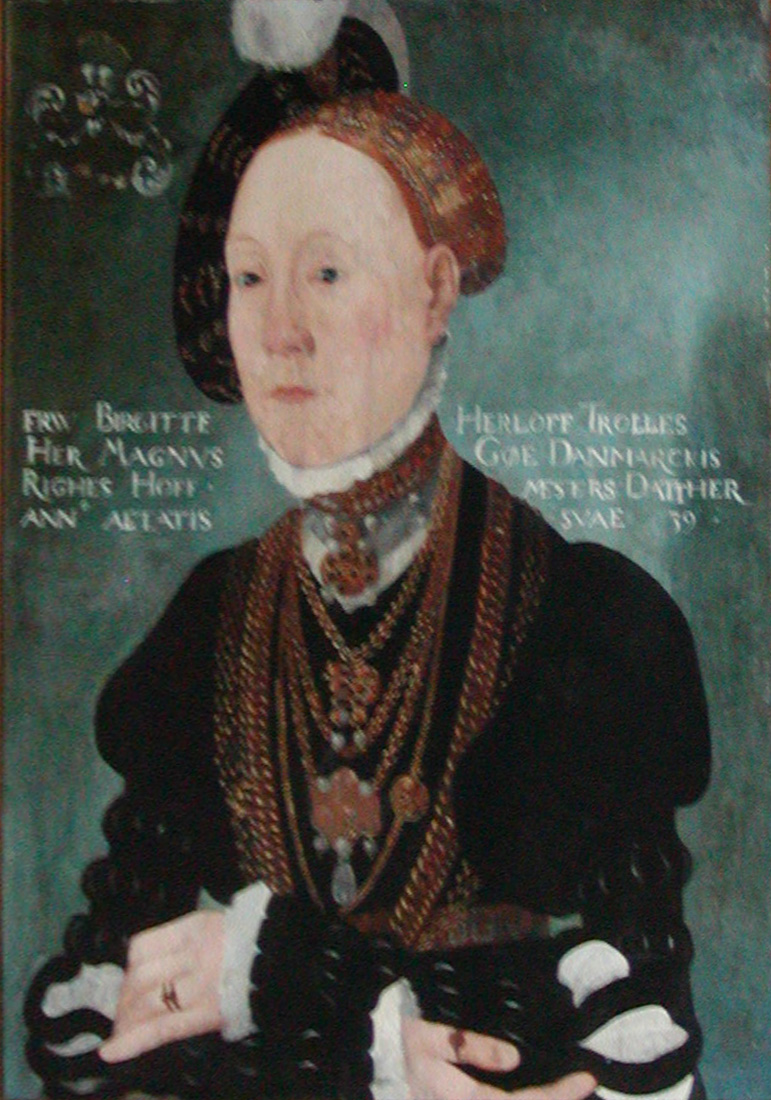
Birgitte Gøye

Birgitte Gøye (1511 – 26 July 1574) was a Danish county administrator, lady in waiting, landholder and noble, co-founder and principal of Herlufsholm School.

== Biography ==
She was the daughter of Mogens Gøye and Mette Bydelsbak and the sister of Eline Gøye. She was raised in a convent, Ringkloster, and in 1538 became lady in waiting to Queen Dorothea of Saxe-Lauenburg. She had been engaged against her will by her family to Jesper Daa in 1525, but in 1540, she was freed from the engagement, which until 1582 was as binding as a marriage. Thanks to her friendship with the queen, the king had professors and bishops investigate the matter and then issued a new law that banned parents from arranging engagements for their minor children.

She married courtier Herluf Trolle in 1544. She had no issue, but raised many foster daughters from the nobility in her home and arranged their marriages. In 1565, she founded the Herlufsholm School by donating her estate Skovkloster Abbey (Skovkloster) to it, and functioned as its principal until 1567. She was the county administrator of Tølløse until terminated in 1566. in 1571 she lost her two estates, Kappelgården at Køge and Ringkloster at Skanderborg. In 1572 she returned to Næstved and only shortly afterwards the crown gave her a life estate at Ydernæs manor (Ydernæs ved Næstved).

Her husband Herluf Trolle died during 1565 and Birgitte Gøye died during 1574. Both Herluf Trolle and Birgitte Gøye were buried together at Herlufsholm in a tomb made by the Flemish sculptor Cornelis Floris de Vriendt (1514–1575).

== See also ==
- Gøye family

== Other literature ==
- Axel Liljefalk: Herluf Trolle og Birgitte Gjøe, deres Liv, deres Gerning, 1910.
- G.L. Wad (red.): Breve til og fra Herluf Trolle og Birgitte Gjøe, 1893.
- T.A. Becker: Herluf Trolle og Birgitte Gøie, 1885.
