= Gulland =

Gulland is a surname. Notable people with the surname include:

- John Gulland (1864–1920), British politician
- John Masson Gulland (1898–1947) Scottish biochemist
- Robin Milner-Gulland (born 1936), British scholar
- Sandra Gulland (born 1944), American-born Canadian writer
- Elizabeth Gulland (1857–1934), British artist

== See also ==
- HMT Gulland (T239), Isles-class trawler of the Royal Navy
- Gulland - an old name for the Swedish island of Gotland when it was under Danish rule. See da:Gotland
