= Swedish warship Mars =

Swedish warship that was built between 1563 and 1564

Coordinates: 57°08′25″N 17°20′56″E

History

Sweden
- Launched: 1563
- Fate: Sank on 31 May 1564

General characteristics
- Length: Between Perpendiculars approximately 43 to 45 metres
- Beam: 45.5 Swedish Fot (13.7 metres)
- Propulsion: Sails
- Crew: 350 sailors, 450 soldiers

Mars, also known as Makalös ("peerless; astounding"), traditionally referred to as Jutehataren ("The Jute Hater"), was a Swedish warship that was built between 1561 and 1563. She was the leading ship of King Eric XIV of Sweden's fleet and one of the largest warships of the time. In 1564, during the Northern Seven Years' War, she caught fire and exploded during the First battle of Öland in the Baltic Sea.

== Background ==
Eric XIV of Sweden succeeded Gustav Vasa in 1560. He needed to consolidate the kingdom that he had inherited from his father, but was ambitious to build upon that. A strong navy could give Sweden the opportunity to tax foreign ships, so helping the economy. The keel of Mars was laid in 1561 and she was complete by the autumn of 1563, by which time the Northern Seven Years' War had broken out.

Mars was built during a time when both ship construction methods and naval tactics were undergoing change and development. Carvel construction had arrived in northern European waters during the previous century, (Note: Carvel-built ships started to be used by the ship-owners of Europe's Atlantic coast in the 1430s. Carvel ships had visited this area from the Mediterranean in the preceding century. The earliest documented building of a carvel ship in England is dated to 1463-1466. The Danish crown had a carvel ship built in 1474 and the archaeologically-investigated Gribshunden was built in 1480 as another example of this technique. By the approach of the middle of the 16th century, most European powers were building warships in carvel construction.) but this was not a single-step process and techniques were still being developed, as the archaeology of the wreck of Mars shows. The naval tactics of the time were moving from a focus on boarding to greater emphasis on stand-off gunnery to defeat the enemy. Again, this was a slow transition, ultimately producing the line of battle that became standard from c. 1672. At the time that Mars was built, the major maritime power of Europe (the Dutch) favoured close-range melee actions, with individual ships picking an opponent of roughly their own size.

== Battle of Öland: sinking ==
The First battle of Öland took place over two days, starting on the 30th May 1564. The first day went well for the Swedish fleet. They sank one Lübeckian ship and badly damaged the Danish flagship Fortuna. Both sides withdrew for the night to rest after the action, but when they re-engaged in the morning, the Swedish fleet had become dispersed due to bad weather overnight. Without the close support of the rest of the fleet, Mars was attacked by several enemy ships and some incendiaries set her alight. Admiral Jacob Bagge, the Swedish commander, ordered her colours to be struck. Mars was boarded by some 300 Lübeckians – eager to claim their share of the prize, but the fire reached the magazine and she blew up in a massive explosion. Eye-witnesses described the foremast being projected into the air "like a cross-bow bolt". She sank very quickly.

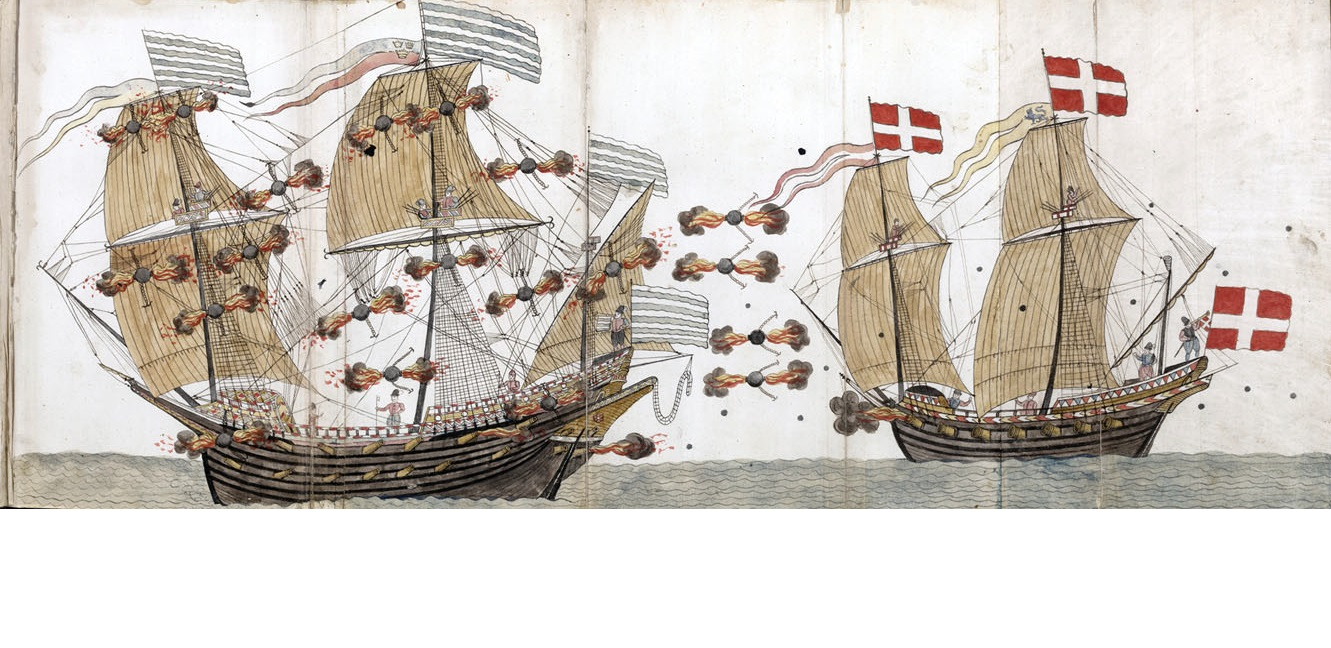
An illustration of a Swedish warship, probably Mars, under attack by a Danish ship

== Wreck ==
The wreck of Mars settled to the sea bed at a depth of 75 metres (246 ft) 12 nautical miles (22 km; 14 mi) north-east of Öland. At this depth and with the exact location unknown, the highly valuable bronze guns were out of reach of any historic salvage attempt. (Note: Guns were recovered by contemporary salvage efforts on a number of early modern wrecks, including, for example, Vasa (depth 32 metres (105 ft)) and Mary Rose (depth of 11 metres (36 ft) at low tide).) After the explosion, the ship's hull was broken into three main pieces at the surface and these sank to the bottom independently. With the forward part of the hull mostly destroyed, these major fragments were the port side, the starboard side and the lower part of the hull.

The wreck site was located by the company Ocean Discovery in 2011 after a long-term search with sidescan sonar. It was clear that the wreck of a large wooden vessel had been found, with many cast bronze cannon. The initial archaeological investigation was carried out by a collaboration of the Maritime Archaeological Research Institute (MARIS) at Södertörn University, MMT (a company that carries out marine surveys, mostly for the oil and gas industry), Ocean Discovery (the company that located the site) and the TV production company Deep Sea Productions. The depth required divers to use mixed gas and rebreather techniques. As well as extensive visits by divers, some of the archaeological investigation was carried out by photography from ROVs, with multibeam sonars and a bottom-based acoustic scanning technique (called "Blueview").

== See also ==
- Mary Rose
- Madre de Deus
- São Martinho (1580)
- Spanish ship Nuestra Señora del Rosario (1587)

== Bibliography ==
- Adams, Jonathan (2013). A maritime archaeology of ships: innovation and social change in late medieval and early modern Europe (1. ed.). Oxford: Oxbow Books. ISBN 978-1-84217-297-1.
- Eriksson, Niklas (3 July 2019). "How Large Was Mars ? An investigation of the dimensions of a legendary Swedish warship, 1563–1564". The Mariner's Mirror. 105 (3): 260–274. doi:10.1080/00253359.2019.1615775.
- Eriksson, Niklas; Rönnby, Johan (March 2017). "Mars (1564): the initial archaeological investigations of a great 16th-century Swedish warship: MARS (1564) A 16TH-CENTURY SWEDISH WARSHIP". International Journal of Nautical Archaeology. 46 (1): 92–107. doi:10.1111/1095-9270.12210.
- Lambert, Andrew D. (2000). War at sea in the age of the sail: 1650-1850. London: Cassell. ISBN 0-304-35246-2.
- "The movie "Mars Makalös"". MMT.
