= Battle of Mared =

1563 Swedish-Danish battle

- Part of Northern Seven Years' War
Date	9 November 1563
Location	Mared, Denmark (present-day Oskarström, Sweden) 56°47′45″N 12°57′45″E
Result	Dano–Norwegian victory

Belligerents
Sweden	Denmark–Norway

Commanders and leaders
Eric XIV	Frederick II

Strength
12,000 men	4,000 men

Casualties and losses
740 men	200 men

Battle of Mared (Swedish: Slaget vid Mared) was a battle during the Nordic Seven Years' War between the Swedish and Danish forces on 9 November 1563. The battle was held on the site of present-day locality Oskarström in Sweden. The Danes had around 4,000 men.

After the outbreak of the war, a Swedish army under the command of King Eric XIV marched into Halland. The goal was to besiege Halmstad, but it failed because of the lack of artillery. Since King Frederick II of Denmark and Norway was on his way with reinforcements, the Swedes pulled back. But they were caught up in Mared on the border between Halland and Småland, where they were defeated.

The Danes were victorious, but there was no decisive victory, as the Swedes managed to pull back. As a result of the battle, the Swedes lost some 740 men, including many good officers.
