= Jakob Bagge =

Swedish nobleman (1502–1577)

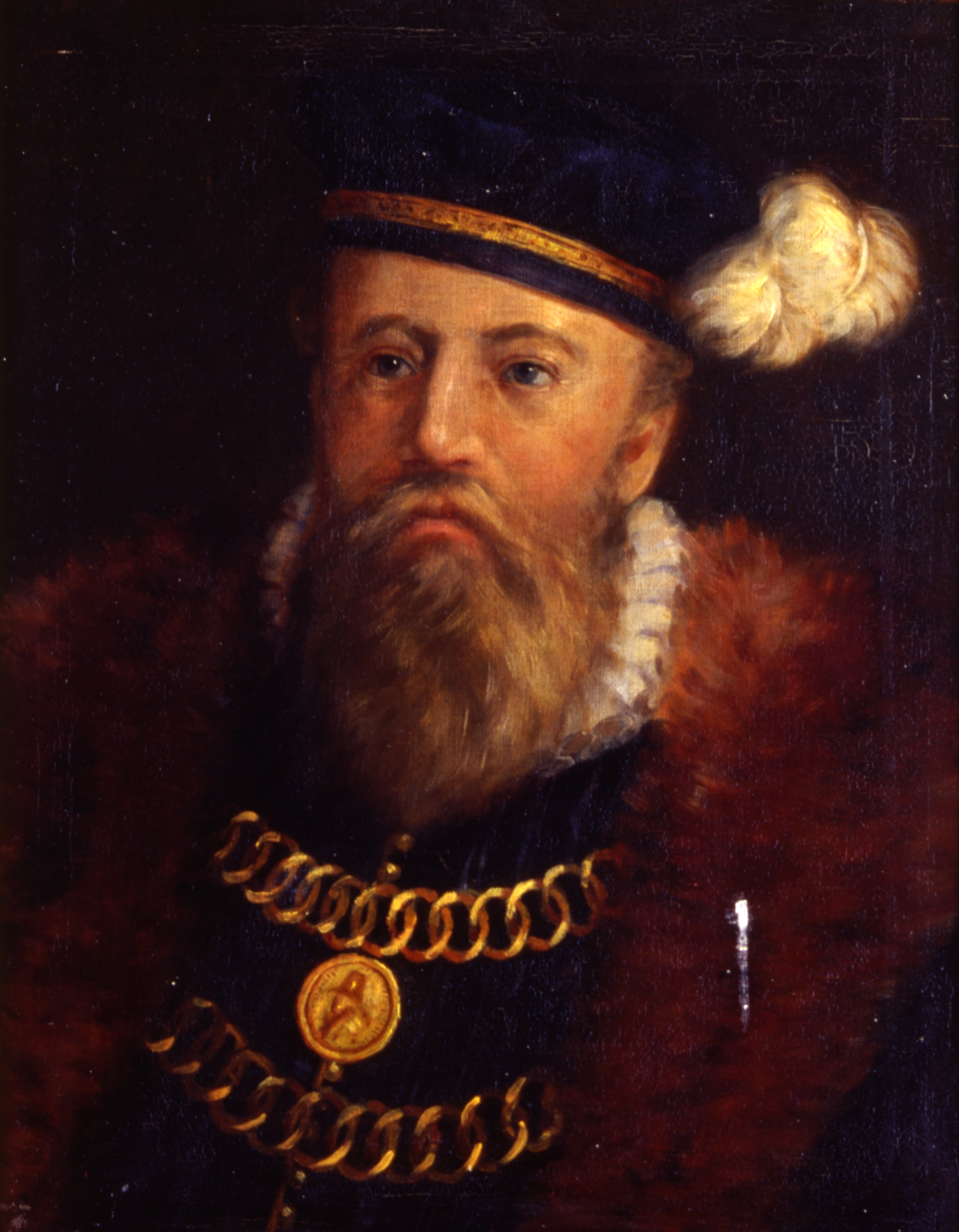
- Born: 1 May 1502; Norway
- Died: 14 January 1577 (aged 74); Stockholm, Sweden
- Military career
- Rank: Admiral
- Conflicts: Count's Feud; Dacke War; Northern Seven Years' War; Action of 30 May 1563; Battle of Öland (1563); First battle of Öland (1564)

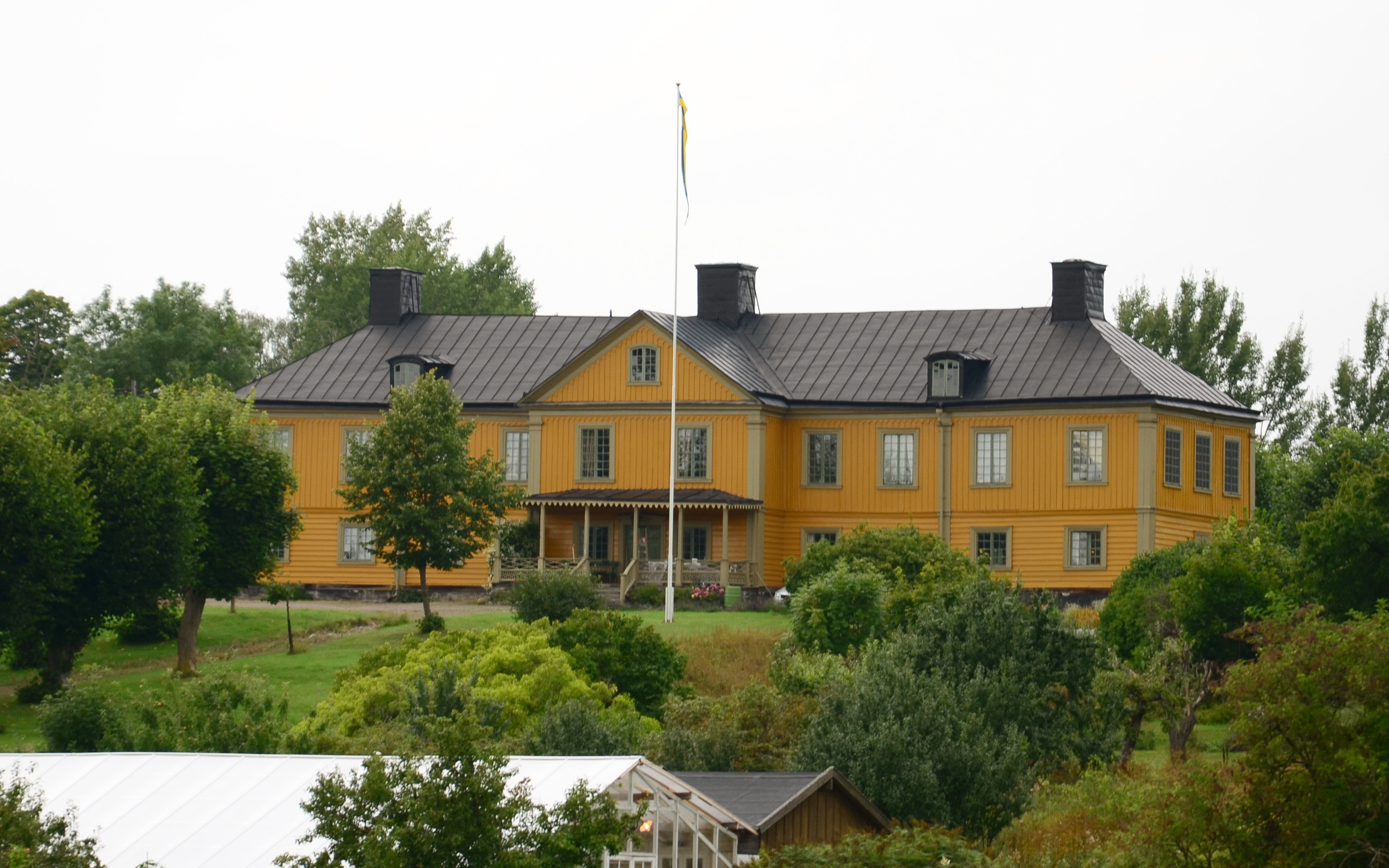
Boo gård (2012)

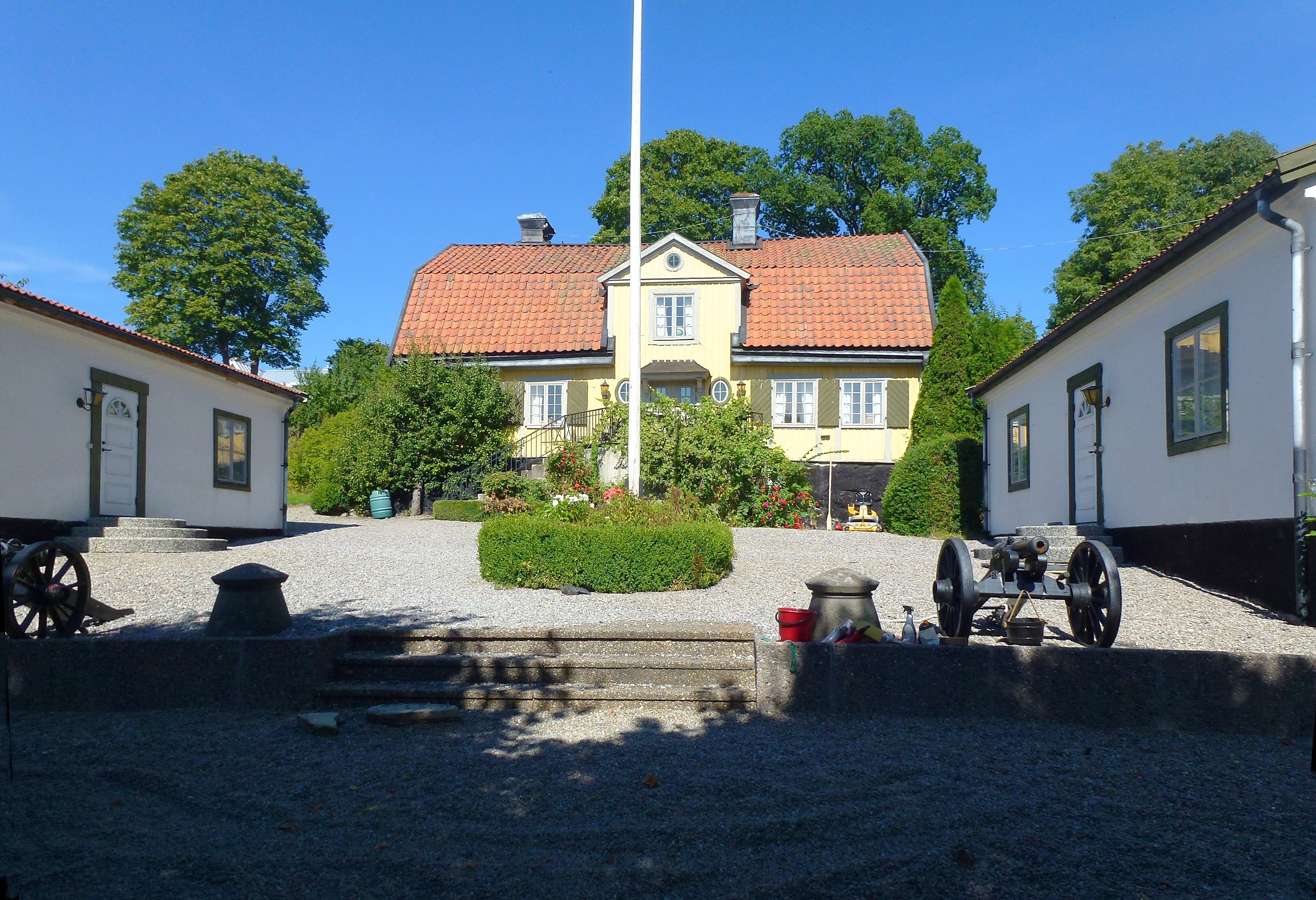
Lännersta gård (2015)

Jakob Tordsson Bagge (1 May 1502 – 14 January 1577) was a Norwegian born, Swedish admiral and nobleman.

== Biography ==
Coat of arms of HMS Jacob Bagge, part of the Navy of Sweden

Bagge was born as the son of Norwegian nobleman Thord Olofsson Bagge and his wife Ingeborg Jakobsdotter. Both he and his father were first in the military service of Denmark. He entered Swedish military service for King Gustav Vasa in 1522. He fought for Sweden in the Count's Feud of 1534–1536. He took part in the suppression of the rebellion of Nils Dacke in 1542. By the 1550s, Bagge was considered the most experienced of Sweden's admirals. He served with Baron Klas Horn (1517–1566) at Vyborg Castle during 1557. He participated in the battle against the Danish forces at the Battle of Bornholm on 30 May 1563. He subsequently fought in the Northern Seven Years' War of 1563–1570.

He received his nobility from King Eric XIV of Sweden and in 1559 his land possession was extended. He was associated with the estates Lännersta gård and Boo gård both in Nacka Municipality. He also held Mem Castle (Mems slott) in the parish of Tåby in Norrköping Municipality.
