= Northern Seven Years' War =

16th-century war fought in Scandinavia

- Part of Northern Wars and Livonian War
- Clockwise, from top left: Daniel Rantzau at Tureby Bro; Battle of Axtorna; First Battle of Öland
Date	13 August 1563 – 13 December 1570 (7 years and 4 months)
Location	Northern Europe
Result	See Peace negotiations and consequences Full results: Treaty of Stettin (1570); Swedish victory against Poland–Lithuania. (Note: Sweden fought Poland–Lithuania in Estonia, which ended in a Swedish victory.); Disputed result between Denmark and Sweden; Denmark becomes the dominant Nordic power; Sweden was forced to pay 150,000 riksdaler; Sweden was also forced to pay 75,000 daler to Lübeck.
Territorial changes	Status quo ante bellum in Scandinavia: Sweden turned over her possessions in Livonia for a payment by Holy Roman Emperor Maximilian II.

Belligerents
Denmark–Norway; Free City of Lübeck; Poland–Lithuania (Note: Polish–Lithuanian Commonwealth after July 1569.)	Sweden

Commanders and leaders
Frederick II; Daniel Rantzau †; Herluf Trolle †; Otte Rud †; Franz Brockenhuus †; Peder Huitfeldt; Jacob Brockenhuus; Peder Skram; Kristoffer Throndsen; Hans Lauritsen; Bartholomeus Tinnappel; Friedrich Knebel; Sigismund Augustus	Eric XIV; John III; Jakob Bagge; Klas Horn; Charles de Mornay; Claude Collart; Bo Birgersson Grip †; Jakob Hästesko

Casualties and losses
Heavy	100,000 dead, including civilians

The Northern Seven Years' War (also known as the Nordic Seven Years' War, the First Northern War, the Seven Years' War of the North or the Seven Years War in Scandinavia) was fought between the Kingdom of Sweden and a coalition of Denmark–Norway, Lübeck, and Poland–Lithuania between 1563 and 1570. The war was motivated by the dissatisfaction of King Frederick II of Denmark with the dissolution of the Kalmar Union, and the will of King Eric XIV of Sweden to break Denmark's dominating position. The fighting continued until both armies had been exhausted, and many men died. The resulting Treaty of Stettin was a stalemate, with neither party gaining any new territory.

== Context ==
The Kalmar Union of the three former Scandinavian Kingdoms of Sweden, Norway, and Denmark lasted on and off from 1397 to 1523, until it finally collapsed following the continued Swedish resentment of Danish domination.

A successful rebellion in 1471 led to Swedish victory at the Battle of Brunkeberg, which established a powerful anti-Union movement under the leadership of the Bonde–Sture nobles. In 1520, Christian II of Denmark reconquered Sweden and took a bloody revenge on the anti-Union faction at the Stockholm Bloodbath. More than 80 noble men and ladies, including leading citizens of Stockholm, were executed, but the result severely backfired on Christian II. The violence elicited strong reactions in Sweden for years to come, and the Union was broken by the successful Swedish War of Liberation from 1521 to 1523. Christian II was condemned by the Pope, and he abdicated in 1523. The subsequent Danish kings Frederick I and Christian III, turned their attention mainly on the Reformation in Denmark–Norway and Holstein and the Count's Feud civil war, and relations with Sweden were generally peaceful.

In Sweden, the internal power vacuum, combined with the abdication of Christian II, provided the opportunity for Gustav Vasa to consolidate control of Sweden and claim the throne in June 1523, with the support of peasants and the Hanseatic towns of Lübeck and Danzig. Under Vasa, the Kalmar Union was finally dissolved, and Sweden began establishing itself as a rival power of Denmark–Norway. Gustav Vasa's Sweden was in a weak position in 1523, as access to the North Sea was dominated by the Danish Sound Dues and limited to a 20 kilometer stretch on the Kattegat in the vicinity of Älvsborg, close to modern Gothenburg. Furthermore, Denmark controlled the Baltic, limiting Swedish movement there.

Gustav Vasa changed the military structure in Sweden, which did not bear immediate fruit in the Nordic Seven Years' War but was to have a lasting impact on Sweden's fortune. In 1544 he used the old Scandinavian concept of Uppbåd (levy or the prerogative to call up some fraction of men from each district in an emergency) to establish one of the first native standing armies in Europe. The men served on standby, remaining at home in peacetime, and being paid by tax concessions, but were required to assemble and drill. This system was later expanded as the Swedish allotment system. By 1560 when Gustav Vasa died, every ten peasants were required to provide one soldier who must serve anywhere domestic or foreign as required by the king.

== Casus belli ==
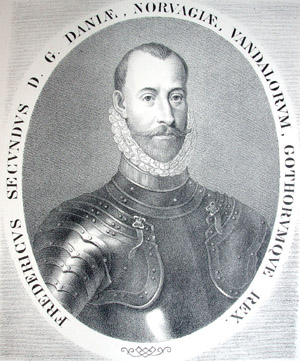
Frederick II (1534–1588), King of Denmark and Norway 1559–1588

After the deaths of Christian III and Gustav Vasa, in 1559 and 1560 respectively, both countries now had young and hawkish monarchs, Eric XIV of Sweden and Frederick II of Denmark. Frederick II envisioned the resurrection of the Kalmar Union under Danish leadership, while Eric wanted to finally break the dominating position of Denmark.

Shortly after his coronation in 1559, King Frederick II of Denmark ordered his ageing field-commander Johan Rantzau to avenge the humiliating Danish defeat against the small peasant republic of Ditmarsh, which was defeated in a matter of a few weeks and brought under the Danish-Norwegian crown. During the next year, the Danish expansion continued with the possession of the Baltic Sea island of Ösel.

Eric XIV (1533–1577), King of Sweden 1560–1568

In 1561, when a sizeable remnant of the Order states in the northern Baltics were secularized by its grand master Gotthard Kettler, both Denmark and Sweden were attracted to intervene in the Livonian War. During this conflict, King Eric of Sweden successfully obstructed the Danish plans to conquer Estonia. He sought to dominate the Baltic Sea, while unsuccessfully pressing for Frederick to remove the traditionally Swedish insignia of Three Crowns from the Danish coat of arms; a bone of contention since Christian III and Gustav Vasa. In February 1563, Swedish messengers were sent to Hesse to negotiate Eric's marriage with Christine of Hesse but were held back in Copenhagen. In retaliation, Eric added the insignia of Norway and Denmark to his own coat of arms and refused Danish requests to remove these symbols.

Lübeck, upset over obstacles to trade introduced by Eric to hinder the Russian trade as well as withdrawn trade privileges, joined Denmark in a war alliance. The Polish–Lithuanian union also joined, desiring control of the Baltic trade. Skirmishes broke out in May 1563, before war was officially declared in August that year.

== War ==
Map of pillaging and battles of the Northern Seven Years War. Red dots show places pillaged or torched by Denmark, chiefly Daniel Rantzau. Yellow dots show places pillaged or torched by Sweden. Modern administrative borders are shown.

=== Initial phase ===
In May, the first movements of the war started as a Danish fleet under Jakob Brockenhuus sailed towards the Baltic. At Bornholm, on 30 May 1563, the fleet fired on the Swedish navy under Jakob Bagge, even though war had not officially been declared. A battle arose that ended with Danish defeat.

German royal emissaries were sent to negotiate a peace, but at the meeting place of Rostock no Swedes appeared. On 13 August 1563, war was declared by emissaries from Denmark and Lübeck in Stockholm. The same month, Danish king Frederik II attacked Älvsborg. At the beginning of the war the Danes advanced from Halland with a 25,000-strong army of professional mercenaries and captured Sweden's gateway to the west, Älvsborg Fortress, after only three days of bombardment and a six-hour assault on 4 September. This achieved the Danish aim of cutting off Sweden from the North Sea, blocking the all-important salt imports. Eric then attacked Halmstad, without result; the Swedish counterattack was driven back by the professional Danish army. After the king's departure from his army, Charles de Mornay stepped in as the commanding officer and was beaten by the Danish at the Battle of Mared.

At sea a battle broke out near Öland on 11 September, whereafter the war took a pause.

=== Campaigns ===
==== South ====
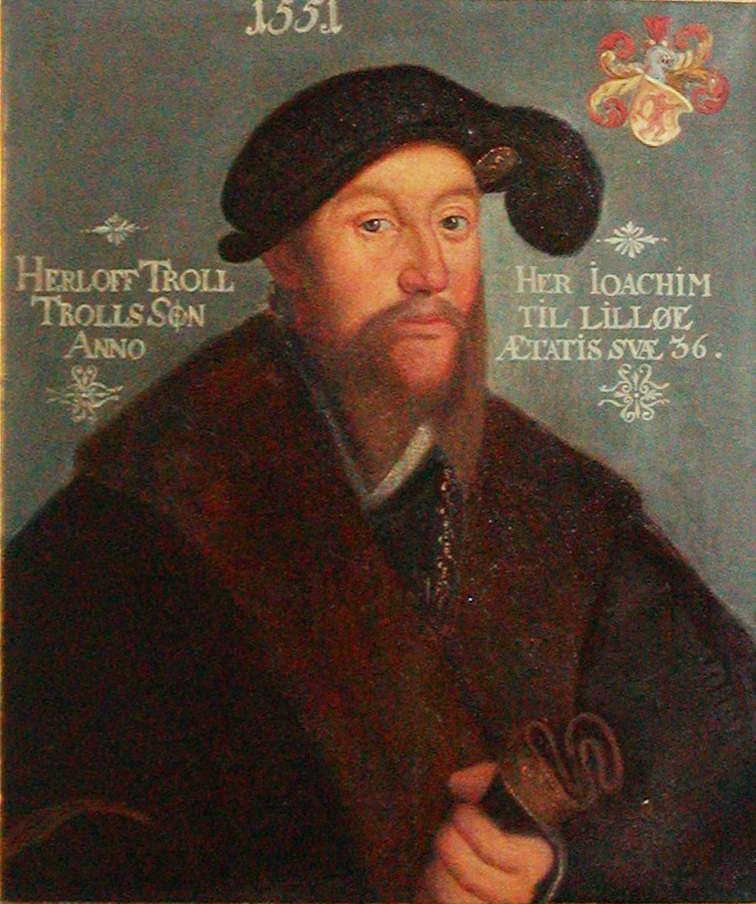
Herluf Trolle in 1551

On 30 May 1564 a battle broke out between the Swedish navy and the Danish–Lübeck navy between Gotland and Öland. The Swedish navy was under the command of Jakob Bagge, and the Danish–Lübeck navy was under the command of Herluf Trolle. Bagge was captured and the largest warship of the Baltic, the Mars (also known as the Makalös), sunk. The Swedish navy retreated to Stockholm leaving a sea blockade in effect. Klas Horn became the new commander and met the Danish fleet at the island Jungfrun north of Öland 14 August. An inconclusive fight left the sea blockade in effect.

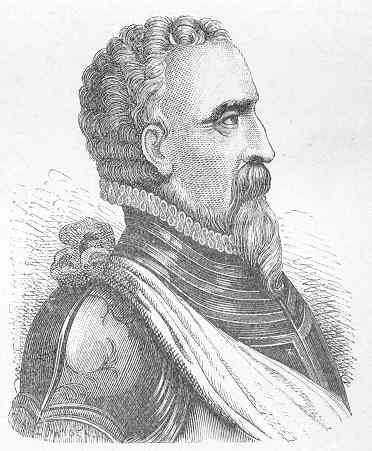
Daniel Rantzau

Horn attacked the provinces Halland and Skåne in 1565 and made several attempts at Bohuslän and Uddevalla. The Danish burned old Lödöse in the province of Västergötland. Eric initially led the army against the Danish himself, but then turned over command to Nils Boije, who on 28 August 1564 took Varberg. The Danish army under Daniel Rantzau beat the Swedish army in the Battle of Axtorna on 20 October 1565.

The Swedes fared better at sea. Horn, commanding the Swedish navy, pursued a Danish–Lübeck fleet onto the German coast where most of it was destroyed. After this victory Horn steered for Öresund and levied a toll on passing ships. On 4 June 1565, the Battle at Buchow took place on the Mecklenburg coast, in which the Danish–Lübeck commander Herluf Trolle was mortally wounded. In the Battle of 7 July 1565, the Swedish navy under Horn defeated a Danish–Lübeck navy under Otto Rud near Bornholm, where Sweden captured the Danish flagship the Jegermesther. This ensured the command of the eastern Baltic by the Swedes that year.

In January 1566 Sweden unsuccessfully laid siege to Bohus Fortress in Bohuslän (then a Norwegian province). Daniel Rantzau then moved his forces into Västergötland. At sea Horn returned to taking toll charges in the Baltic. An indecisive battle at sea outside of Öland occurred on 26 July 1566. On 28 July, half the Danish–Lübeck Navy was lost in a storm at sea. Horn was then called to command troops on land, where he died 9 September.

==== North ====
Sweden occupied the undefended Norwegian province of Jemtland, which was quickly reconquered by a counterattack by forces under command of the Norwegian governor of Trøndelag. The forces were unwilling to launch a counterattack on Swedish land. In 1564 the Swedes marched under Claude Collart and re-occupied Jemtland, as well as Herjedalen and Trøndelag, including the city of Trondheim. Initially facing little opposition from the locals, their subsequent ill treatment of the Trøndelag natives, along with tax pressure, laid the groundwork for later resistance to Swedish invasion. Also, Trøndelag was assisted by the governor of Bergenhus, Erik Rosenkrantz, who forced 3,500 local peasants to assist him and his 50 professional soldiers. The Swedes saw Bergenhus as their next target. Although the 400 Swedish soldiers were repelled from Trøndelag, Sweden continued to occupy Jämtland and Härjedalen. These provinces were later regained by Denmark–Norway following the peace process in 1570.

Sweden also launched attacks towards Eastern Norway. In the south-east Sweden captured Båhus Fortress, but lost it in 1566. Another part of the army marched through the valley Østerdalen in 1567, captured Hamar, and continued towards Oslo. They reached as far as the Skiensfjord, and torched Skien at one point. In Oslo, however, citizens torched the city before invaders could seize it. From the south-east, more Swedish forces were then sent to aid in capturing Akershus Fortress near Oslo. These forces torched Konghelle and Sarpsborg on their way. They were repelled from Oslo by local forces together with men belonging to Erik Rosenkrantz and the King of Denmark and Norway. The Swedes retreated in a north-eastern direction, torching Hamar on their way, destroying Hamar Cathedral and the bishop's fortified palace Hamarhus.

=== Later phase ===
Localities of Rantzau's winter campaign. Red dots mark plundered and burned localities. The crossing of Sommen is in blue.

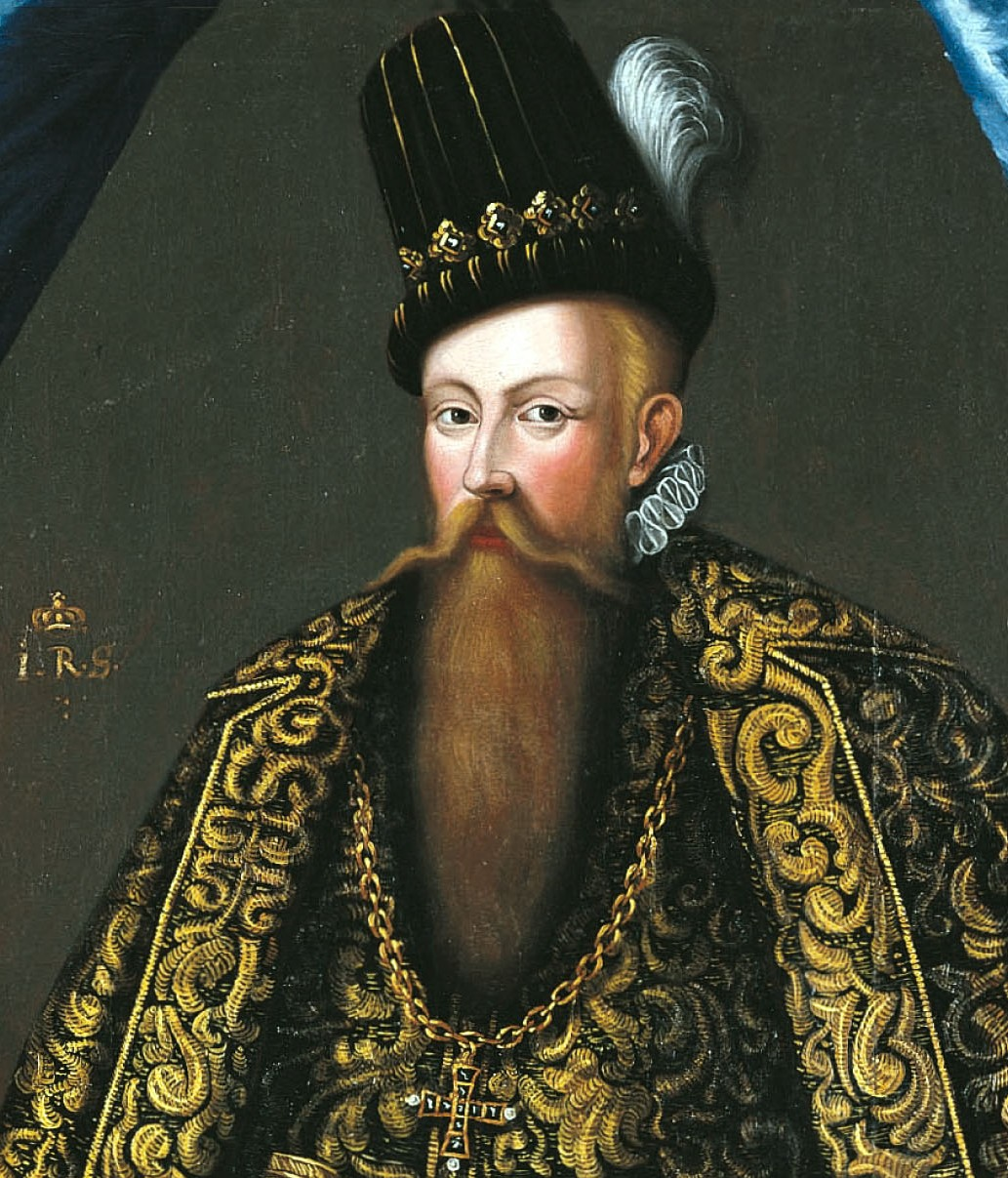
John III (1537–1592), King of Sweden 1568–1592

The Danish mercenary army was superior to the Swedish peasant army, but the professional army would not fight until their pay was current. Because only a fraction of the army would march, Denmark had to give up the plan to take the fortress of Kalmar and settle for an attack on Stockholm instead. In August 1564, Eric attacked Blekinge and his army occupied it cruelly (most infamously during the Ronneby Bloodbath), though the Danish later reclaimed this.

Eric XIV turned insane, paralyzing the Swedish war effort. The Danish were exhausted and made no serious attacks until Rantzau attacked Småland and Östergötland with about 8,500 men. He burned every field and house and destroyed every head of livestock he could. An attempt to cut off his retreat over the Holaveden failed, as Rantzau's army went over the ice of lake Sommen and in the middle of February 1568 he returned to Halland.

Attempts were made to make peace between the fighting nations during these years. Negotiators included the dukes of Pomerania, French messenger Charles Dancay, and Holy Roman Emperors Ferdinand I and Maximilian II. The emperors wanted Denmark and Sweden to give back the territories won in Livonia, during the ongoing Livonian War, but Sweden refused to give in to those demands.

In 1568, the Swedish duke John staged a successful coup d'etat against his brother, King Eric. Enthroned as king with the name John III, he began negotiations with Denmark-Norway, and on 18 November the same year this led to a draft peace agreement in Roskilde. This was turned down by the Swedes, however, and in 1569 war stirred again. The Danes attacked and reclaimed Varberg, on 13 November. The Swedes on the other hand now had great success in Skåne.

== Peace negotiations and consequences ==
At this point, both armies were exhausted, leading to further negotiations toward peace. In September 1570 a meeting began in Stettin and peace was finally reached on 13 December 1570 with the Treaty of Stettin. The Swedish king withdrew the claims to Norway, Skåne, Halland, Blekinge, and Gotland, while the Danes withdrew their claims to Sweden. Denmark became the dominant Nordic power. In addition, the Kalmar Union was declared dissolved. The Swedes ransomed Älvsborg with 150,000 riksdaler and had to hand back captured warships. The disputes concerning the Three Crowns insignia were unresolved and remained a source of future conflict.

=== Result ===
The result between Denmark–Norway and Sweden is disputed, some claim that the war ended in a Danish victory, while others claim that it ended inconclusively.

== See also ==
- List of wars involving Poland
- Livonian War – 16th-century war in Eastern Europe – contemporary struggle for hegemony on the eastern Baltic coast (1558–1583)
- Naval battle near Hel
- Polish–Swedish wars

== Sources ==
- Eriksson, Bo (2007). Lützen 1632. Norstedts Pocket, Stockholm. ISBN 978-91-7263-790-0. In Swedish.
- Ersland, Geir Atle; Sandvik, Hilde (1999). Norsk historie 1300-1625. Volume two of Norsk historie (in Norwegian). Oslo: Samlaget. ISBN 82-521-5182-5.
