= List of wars involving Denmark =

This is a list of wars and war-like conflicts involving the modern Kingdom of Denmark and predecessor states.

Danish victory
Danish defeat
Another result *

*e.g. result unknown or indecisive/inconclusive, result of internal conflict inside Denmark, status quo ante bellum, or a treaty or peace without a clear result.

== 700–1300 ==
Year	War	Belligerents (excluding Denmark)		Outcome
Year	War	Allies	Enemies	Outcome
c. 770	Harald Wartooth's invasion of Sweden	Denmark	Sweden	Viking victory: Harald Wartooth subjugates a majority of Sweden
c.770	Battle of Brávellir	Denmark; Wends; Eastern Geats	Sweden; Estonians; Western Geats	Defeat: Harald Wartooth's death
780s-850	Viking invasions of England	Norse Vikings	Kingdom of England	Viking victory: Series of Viking attacks on Christian monasteries in the British Isles
810–811	Invasion of Frisia	Danish Kingdom	Francia	Viking victory: Treaty of Heiligen; Danish border confirmed at The Eider
813	Halfdan the Mild's revolt	Danish Kingdom	Halfdan the Mild	Revolt successful Denmark is expelled and Vestfold gains independence.
838	Battle of Hingston Down	Danish Vikings; Cornwall	Anglo-Saxons	Defeat: Viking Defeat
845	Siege of Paris (845)	Norse Vikings	Francia	Viking victory: Viking plunder of Paris
851	Battle of Aclea	Danish Vikings	Kingdom of Wessex	Defeat: West-Saxon victory
851	Battle of Sandwich	Danish Vikings	Kingdom of Kent	Defeat: Viking Defeat
853	Invasion of Courland	Danish Vikings	Curonians	Defeat: Curonian victory
859	Viking raid on Nekor (ca. 859)	Norse Vikings	Kingdom of Nekor	Viking victory: Vikings occupied Nekor for 8 days.
865–878	Great Heathen Army's invasion of England	Norse Vikings; Norse–Gaels	Anglo-Saxon kingdoms: Wessex; Northumbria; Mercia; East Anglia; Kingdom of Strathclyde; Kingdom of Alba	Viking victory: Treaty of Wedmore; Establishment of Danelaw
866	Battle of Brissarthe	Danish Vikings; Brittany	Francia	Viking victory: Frankish retreat
875	Battle of Dollar	Danish Vikings	Scotland	viking victory
880	Battle of Thimeon	Danish Vikings	West Francia	Defeat: Viking Defeat
881	Battle of Saucourt-en-Vimeu	Danish Vikings	West Francia	Defeat: 9000 Vikings slain; Vikings starts Raiding Lotharingia
882	Siege of Asselt	Danish Vikings	East Francia	Defeat: Godfrid became a vassal of Charles the Fat and converted to Christianity.
885	Battle of Rochester	Danish Vikings	Anglo-Saxons	Defeat: Viking Defeat
885–886	Siege of Paris (885–886)	Danish Vikings	West Francia	Stalemate: Paris successfully defended; Vikings granted passage of the Seine and 700 livres (pounds) of silver; Vikings raids continued into Burgundy
891	Battle of Leuven (891)	Danish Kingdom	East Francia	Defeat: Death of Sigfried and Godfried
892	Battle of Farnham	Danish Vikings	Anglo-Saxons	Defeat: Viking Defeat
893	Battle of Buttington	Danish Vikings	Mercia; Wessex; Welsh	Defeat: Viking Defeat
894	Battle of Benfleet	Danish Vikings	Wessex; Mercia	Defeat: Viking Defeat
899–902	Æthelwold's Revolt	Followers of Æthelwold ætheling Supported by: Danes of Northumbria; Kingdom of East Anglia	Followers of Edward the Elder: Wessex; Mercia; Kent	Defeat: Victory for Edward the Elder
902	Battle of the Holme	Danish Vikings	Followers of Edward the Elder: Wessex; Kent	Viking victory: Æthelwold killed; Æthelwold's Revolt ended
900s	Olof the Brashs conquest of Denmark	Danish Kingdom	Olof the Brash	Defeat Victory for Olof
911	Siege of Chartres (911)	Danish Vikings	West Francia	Stalemate: West Frankish military victory; Treaty of Saint-Clair-sur-Epte; Rollo is granted lands in northern France in exchange for vassalage, religious conversion and pledge to defend the Seine's estuary from viking raiders
939	Battle of Trans-la-Forêt	Danish Vikings	West Francia; Brittany	Defeat: Decisive Breton victory
955–961	War between King Haakon the Good and the sons of Eirik Bloodaxe	Sons of Eric Bloodaxe; Kingdom of Denmark	Norway	Defeat: Harald Greycloak becomes king of Norway.
974	German–Danish War of 974	Kingdom of Denmark; Kingdom of Norway	Holy Roman Empire; Norwegian Rebels	Defeat: Hedeby under German occupation from 974 to 981
mid-980s	Sweyn's revolt against Harald Bluetooth	Sweyn Forkbeard	Harald Bluetooth	Victory for Sweyn Forkbeard: Harald Bluetooth exiled; Sweyn becomes king of Denmark
986	Battle of Fýrisvellir	Kingdom of Denmark; Jomsvikings	Sweden	Defeat: Swedish Victory
986	Battle of Hjörungavágr	Kingdom of Denmark; Jomsvikings	Norway	Defeat: Norwegian Victory
986	Norwegian-Jomsviking War	Kingdom of Denmark; Jomsvikings	Norway	Defeat: Norwegian Victory; Danish fleet destroyed
992	Erik the Victorious invasion of Denmark	Danish Kingdom	Sweden	Defeat Swedish victory
mid-990s	Eric the Victorious invasion of the Holy Roman Empire	Danish Kingdom Sweden	Holy Roman Empire	Stalemate Stade and Northern Germany gets pillaged and plundered by Vikings. Eric, however, fails to permanently capture land in the Holy Roman Empire.
1000	Battle of Svolder	Kingdom of Denmark; Sweden; Earldom of Lade	Norway	Allied Victory: Partitioning of Norway; Backlash against Christianity
1001	First Battle of Alton	Kingdom of Denmark	Anglo-Saxons	Danish victory: The Anglo-Saxons retreats to Winchester
1001	Battle of Pinhoe	Kingdom of Denmark	Kingdom of England	Danish victory: The Vikings burn Pinhoe to the ground
1004	Battle of Thetford	Kingdom of Denmark	Norway; Anglo-Saxons	Anglo-Norwegian Victory
1010	Battle of Ringmere	Danish Vikings	Anglo-Saxons	Viking victory: Over a three-month period the Danes wasted East Anglia, burning Thetford and Cambridge
1013	Sweyn Forkbeards invasion of England	Kingdom of Denmark	Kingdom of England	Danish victory: Sweyn Forkbeard becomes king of England and dies shortly after
1015–1016	Olav II's conquest of Norway (1015–1016): Raid on Denmark	Kingdom of Sweden; Kingdom of Denmark; Earldom of Orkney	Kingdom of Norway	Defeat: The territorial changes following the Battle of Svolder are reversed
1016	Cnut the Great's invasion of England	Kingdom of Denmark; Kingdom of Norway	Kingdom of England	Dano-Norwegian victory: Personal union formed between Denmark and England in 1018.; Following Edmund's death on 30 November, Cnut ascends to the throne as the sole king of England.
1026	Battle of Helgeå	Kingdom of Denmark; Kingdom of England	Sweden; Norway	Anglo-Danish victory: Subjugation of parts of Sweden
1028–1029	Cnut's Invasion of Norway	North Sea Empire	Norway	Anglo-Danish victory: Norway conquered
1031	Battle of Stiklestad	The "Peasant Army".loyal to Cnut the Great.	Norway	Peasant victory: Death of Olaf II of Norway
1031	Cnuts expedition to Scotland	North Sea Empire	Kingdom of Scotland	victory for the North Sea Empire: Malcolm II, Maelbaethe and Lehmarc subjugated
c.1034	Annexation of Strathclyde	Kingdom of Scotland; North Sea Empire	Kingdom of Strathclyde	Scottish victory: kingdom of Strathclyde conquered
1043	Magnus the Good's conquest of Denmark	Denmark: Wends	Kingdom of Norway: Danish Loyalists	Defeat: Denmark reconquered; Rebellion crushed; Magnus the Good is kept king over both Norway and Denmark; Sweyn Estridsson flees to Sweden
1043	Battle of Lyrskov Heath	Norway: Danish Loyalists	Wends: Danish Rebels	Norwegian and Danish Loyalist victory: Up to 15.000 Wends killed
1043	Norwegian-Wendish War	Norway: Danish Loyalists	Wends: Danish Rebels	Norwegian and Danish Loyalist victory: Destruction the Viking fort Jomsborg, possibly to destroy the Danish competitors to the throne. Plundering of the Wendish town of Jumne.
1048–1064	Invasion of Denmark	Denmark	Norway	Victory: Peace agreement, mutual recognition and Norwegian withdrawal.
1049	Blockade of Flanders	Kingdom of England Kingdom of Denmark	County of Flanders	Victory: Successful blockade of Flanders in support of Henry III, Holy Roman Emperor
1069–1075	Danish attacks on Norman England	Denmark; Earl of Northumbria	Norman England	Stalemate: Danegeld paid; Unsuccessful reconquest of England
1086	Peasant rebellion in Vendsyssel	Denmark	peasants	Defeat: Death of Canute
1093	Battle of Schmilau	Prince Henry; Denmark; Saxony	Obotrites	Victory: Victory for the Christian coalition
1096	Magnus's raids on Halland	Denmark	Norway	Defeat
1129	Intervention in Szczecin Pomerania	Kingdom of Poland Denmark	Pomeranians	Dano-Polish Victory
1131–1157	Danish Civil War (Civil war)	Valdemar I of Denmark Canute V of Denmark	Sweyn III of Denmark	Valdemar Victory: Valdemar I is made king of all of Denmark
1136	Erik Emunes invasion of Rügen	Denmark	Rani	Danish Victory: Rügen conquered and converted, but the Rani returned to their pagan belief after the Danes left.
1144–1147	Wendish Crusade	Denmark; Kingdom of Poland; Holy Roman Empire	Polabian Slavs; West Slavs	Victory
1168 or 1169	Siege of Arkona	Denmark	Rani	Danish Victory: Rügen conquered and converted
1170	Battle of Julin Bridge	Denmark	Pomerania	Danish Victory: entire army of Bogislaw scattered
1181	Battle of Dösjebro	Royalists	Scanian rebels	Royalist Victory
1182	Harald Skraengs uprising	Harald Skraeng; Sweden	Denmark	Victory Uprising quelled
1184	Battle of Greiswald Bay	Denmark	Pomerania; Supported by: Holy Roman Empire	Danish Victory
1189–1192	Third Crusade	Angevin Empire; Kingdom of France; Kingdom of Jerusalem: Knights Templar; Knights Hospitaller; Republic of Pisa; Kingdom of Sicily; Papal States; Holy Roman Empire; Duchy of Bohemia; Armenian Kingdom of Cilicia; Kingdom of Denmark; Republic of Genoa	Ayyubids: Sultanate of Egypt; Emirate of Damascus; Emirate of Hamah; Emirate of Mesopotamia	Crusader Victory: Treaty of Jaffa (1192)
1191	Danish Crusade of 1191	Denmark	Finnish tribes	Unknown result: Canute VI claims victory
1192	Invasion of Bishop Valdemar	Denmark	DenmarkBishop Valdemar; Supported by: Sweden; Norway; Hohenstaufen; Holstein; Ratzeburg; Brandenburg	Victory: Bishop Valdemar is imprisoned
1201	Battle of Stellau	Denmark	County of Holstein	Danish Victory: Holstein Subjugated
1201	Danish Crusade of 1201	Denmark	Finnish tribes	Indecisive: Conquered regions handed over to Sweden
1203–1290	Livonian Crusade	Sword-Brothers; Livonian Order; Denmark; Sweden	Indigenous peoples: Livonians; Latgalians; Selonians; Estonians; Oeselians; Curonians; Semigallians	Victory: Terra Mariana; Duchy of Estonia
1204–1208	The Second Bagler War	Denmark; Bagler Party	Birkebeiner	Peace: Settlement of Kvitsøy; Inge Magnusson becomes king of all of Norway
1210	Battle of Gestilren	Denmark House of Sverker	Sweden House of Eric	Defeat: Eric X of Sweden becomes king of Sweden
1210	Invasion of Pomeralia	Denmark	Pomeralia	Danish Victory: Pomeralia subjugated
1219	Battle of Lyndanisse	Denmark	Non-Christian Estonians	Danish Victory: According to legend, Dannebrog fell from the sky, as an apparently helpful divine intervention, just when the Danish Crusaders were about to lose the battle to the local pagans. The flag has been the official flag of Denmark ever since, making it the world's oldest national flag still in use.
1225	Battle of Mölln (1225)	Denmark	County of Schwerin	Defeat: Danish possessions in Germany rebels
1227	Danish–German war	Denmark	County of Holstein; Hanseatic League	Defeat: Holstein regained independence; Denmark forced to withdraw from northern Germany.
1240–1242	Livonian campaign against Rus': Danish Campaigns to Novgorod	Livonian Order; Denmark	Novgorod Republic	Defeat
1245	Battle of Embo	Denmark; Norway	Kingdom of Scotland	Defeat
1250	Expedition against Frisia	Denmark	Frisian rebels	Defeat: Abel killed
1256-1257	Halland War	Denmark	Norway	Defeat: Norway renounces its claim on Halland; Ingeborg marries Magnus VI of Norway
1259-1261	The Archbishop War	Margaret	Lund Archbishopric; Schleswig Rügen	Defeat: Plunder of Zealand; Loss of Royal possessions in Schleswig
1274-1275	The war against Valdemar Birgersson	(Denmark) Denmark; Magnus III of Sweden	Sweden	Victory: Valdemar, King of Sweden is deposed; Magnus Ladulås is crowned king of Sweden
1276–1278	6000-mark war	Denmark	Sweden	Victory: Magnus III of Sweden agrees to pay 4000 mark
1289–1295	Danish-Norwegian War	Denmark	Norway; Danish outlaws	Defeat: North Halland ceded to Kingdom of Norway

== 1300–1500 ==
Year	War	Belligerents (excluding Denmark)		Outcome
Year	War	Allies	Enemies	Outcome
1304–1310	The Swedish brother's feud	Denmark; Birger Magnusson	Norway; Duke Eric and Valdemar	Victory: Death of Duke Eric and Valdemar.
1316	Battle of Gransee	Denmark; Duchy of Mecklenburg	Margraviate of Brandenburg	Victory: Treaty of Templin
1326–1354	Wars of the Rügen Succession	Christopher II; Duchy of Mecklenburg	Pomerania; Gerhard III	Stalemate: Treaty of Brudersdorf; Treaty of Stralsund
1326	Rebellion of 1326	Christopher II	Gerhard III	Defeat: Overthrowal of Christopher II
1328–1328	Revolts against Valdemar III	Denmark	Peasants on Jutland and Zealand	Victory: Valdemar retains the throne
1340–1360	Reunification of Denmark	Denmark	Holstein; Sweden	Victory: Reunification of Denmark
1341–1343	Kalundborg War	Denmark; Lübeck	Sweden; Holstein	Defeat
1343–1345	St. George's Night Uprising	Teutonic Order: Livonian Order; Denmark	Revala; Harria; Rotalia; Vironia; Oeselia	Victory: Uprising defeated; Denmark sells Duchy of Estonia to the State of the Teutonic Order
1360	Valdemar Atterdag's invasion of Scania	Denmark	Sweden	Victory: Scania conquered; Halland conquered; Blekinge conquered
1361	Valdemar Atterdag's invasion of Gotland	Denmark	Sweden Hanseatic League	Victory: Gotland conquered; Visby ransomed
1361–1365	First Dano-Hanseatic War	Denmark	Norway Hanseatic League; Sweden	Victory: Dissolution of the Anti-Danish Alliance
1367–1370	Great Hanseatic War	Denmark; Norway	Confederation of Cologne; Sweden	Defeat: Treaty of Stralsund (1370)
1384	Swedish invasion of Scania	Denmark	Sweden	* Truce likely signed in 1384 Temporary capture of Laholm by Sweden, followed by subsequent retreat
1389	Battle of Åsle	Denmark; Swedish Nobles	Duchy of Mecklenburg; Sweden	Victory: Margaret I of Denmark becomes regent of Sweden
1392–1398	War with the Victual Brothers	Kalmar Union	Victual Brothers	Victory: Formation of the Kalmar Union.
1403–1400	War in Gotland (1403–1404)	Kalmar Union	(State of the Teutonic Order) Teutonic Order	Teutonic victory: Gotland is purchased by the Kalmar Union after negotiations in 1407
1410–1422	Eric of Pommeranias First Schleswig War	Kalmar Union	House of Schaumburg	Peace agreement: Sigismund, Holy Roman Emperor decides in favor of Denmark
1426–1435	Dano-Hanseatic War	Kalmar Union	House of Schaumburg; Hanseatic League	Defeat: Treaty of Vordingborg
1434–1436	Engelbrekt rebellion	Kalmar Union	Swedish rebels	Defeat: Danish forces temporarily expulsed from Sweden
1436	Amund Sigurdssons Rebellion	Kalmar Union	Norwegian peasants	Victory: Peasant Revolt quelled; Rebels promises loyalty to Eric of Pomerania
1438	Hallvard Graatops Revolt	Kalmar Union	Norwegian peasants	Victory: Revolt suppressed
1438–1441	Dutch–Hanseatic War	Hanseatic League; Denmark Lüneburg; Mecklenburg; Pomerania; Holstein; Brandenburg	Burgundy: County of Holland; Norway	Victory: Treaty of Copenhagen (1441)
1441	Battle of St. Jørgensbjerg	Kalmar Union	Peasant army under Henrik Reventlow	Victory: Rebellion defeated
1448–1449	War on Gotland (1448–1449)	Eric of Pomerania; Supported by: Denmark	Sweden; Supported by: Gutes	Victory: Gotland handed over to Denmark
1448–1451	War of the Norwegian Succession	Denmark; Pro-Danish Norwegians	Sweden; Pro-Swedish Norwegians	Pro-Danish Victory: Christian I becomes king of Norway
1448–1502	Krummedige-Tre Rosor feud	Krummedige family Denmark	Tre Rosor family Sweden	Krummedige victory: The male Tre Rosor line in Norway becomes extinct.; Norwegian monarchy strengthened; Prince Christian maintains control over Norway
1451–1457	Dano-Swedish War (1451-1457)	Denmark; Erik Axelsson Tott	Sweden	Victory: Reinstalment of the Kalmar union
1454–1466	Thirteen Years' War (1454–1466)	Teutonic Order Kalmar Union; Livonian Order; Amsterdam; Duchy of Żagań	Kingdom of Poland Supported by: Prussian Confederation	Defeat: Second Peace of Toruń
1464	Battle of Haraker	Kalmar Union	Sweden	Defeat: Christian I was deposed as king of Sweden
1466–1467	War of Deposition against Jöns Bengtsson Oxenstierna	Supporters of Jöns Bengtsson; Denmark	Rebels under Nils Sture	Defeat: Jöns Bengtsson is deposed
1470–1471	Dano-Swedish War (1470–1471)	Kalmar Union	Sweden	Defeat: Danish failure to conquer Sweden
1497	Battle of Rotebro	Denmark	Sweden	Victory

== 1500–1699 ==
Year	War	Belligerents (excluding Denmark)		Outcome
Year	War	Allies	Enemies	Outcome
1500	Battle of Hemmingstedt	Kalmar Union	Dithmarschen	Defeat: Destruction of the royal army
1501–1503	War of Deposition against King Hans	Kalmar Union	Sweden	Defeat: Hans, King of Denmark deposed as King of Sweden.
1501–1504	Alvsson Rebellion	Kalmar Union	Knut Alvsson (until 1502); Nils Ravaldsson (from 1502); Sweden	Victory: Dano-Norwegian ties solidified
1501–1512	Dano-Swedish War (1501–1512)	Kalmar Union	Sweden; Free City of Lübeck (from 1509)	Victory: Treaty of Malmö
1512–1520	Dano-Swedish War (1512–1520)	Kalmar Union	Sweden	Victory: Danish Victory; Danish conquer of Sweden
1521–1523	Swedish War of Liberation	Kalmar Union	Sweden; Free City of Lübeck (from 1522)	Defeat: Treaty of Malmö; Regained Swedish independence; Dissolution of Kalmar Union
1523–1524	Siege of Copenhagen (1523)	Christian II	Frederick I of Denmark	Frederickian Victory: Diposition of Christian II
1524–1525	Revolts for the reinstalment of Christian II	Denmark; Norway	Rebels supporting Christian II	Victory: Failure to reinstal Christian II
1532	Christian II's Invasion of Norway	Denmark; Norway	Christian II	Victory: Invasion failed; Christian II captured
1534–1536	Count's Feud (civil war)	Christian III; Duchy of Schleswig; Holstein; Sweden; Duchy of Prussia; Jutland	Christian II; Christopher of Oldenburg; Free City of Lübeck; Skåne; Malmø; Copenhagen; Zealand	Reformation in Denmark–Norway and Holstein
1536–1537	Olav Engelbrektsson's Rebellion	Denmark; Protestants	Catholics	Victory: Creation of Denmark-Norway
1538–1550	Icelandic Reformation	Denmark–Norway; Protestants	Catholics	Victory: Jón Arason defeated and captured; Collapse of Catholicism in Iceland
1540	Peasant's Rebellion in Telemark	Denmark–Norway	Norwegian peasants	Rebellion suppressed
1542	Dacke War	Kingdom of Sweden (Holy Roman Empire) Landsknechte; Denmark-Norway	Småland Peasants under Nils Dacke Östergötland peasant militia	Victory: Royal power strengthened; No further civil wars or major uprisings
1542	Italian War of 1542–1546	France; Ottoman Empire: Regency of Algiers; Jülich-Cleves-Berg; Denmark-Norway	Holy Roman Empire; Saxony; Brandenburg; Spain (Kingdom of England) England	Status quo ante bellum: Treaty of Speyer (1544)
1558–1583	Livonian War	Livonian Confederation; Polish–Lithuanian Commonwealth; Denmark-Norway Kingdom of Sweden; Zaporozhian Cossacks; Principality of Transylvania	Tsardom of Russia; Qasim Khanate; Kingdom of Livonia	Victory: Sweden gains Estonia; Livonia, Courland and Semigallia to Poland–Lithuania; Denmark–Norway gains Ösel
1559	Campaign of 1559	Denmark-Norway	Dithmarschen	Victory: Conquest of Dithmarschen
1563–1570	Northern Seven Years' War	Denmark-Norway; Free City of Lübeck Poland–Lithuania	Sweden	Status quo ante bellum: Treaty of Stettin (1570)
1563–1568	Polish–Swedish War (1563–1568)	Denmark–Norway; Lübeck	Sweden	Defeat
1571	Danish attack on Poland: Naval battle near Hel	Denmark-Norway	Polish–Lithuanian Commonwealth	Victory
1575–1577	Danzig rebellion	City of Danzig; Denmark-Norway	Polish–Lithuanian Commonwealth	Peace: Danzig withstanded the siege; Danzig law confirmed; Danzig had to pay 200,000 złotys
1611–1613	Kalmar War	Denmark-Norway	Sweden	Victory: Treaty of Knäred (1613)
1618–1620	Conquest of Koneswaram Temple	Denmark-Norway; Kingdom of Kandy	Portuguese Ceylon	Defeat: Failure to monopolize Ceylon; Danish India established
1619	Action of 19 February 1619	Denmark-Norway	French pirates France	Victory: Danish Victory; French ships conquered
1619	Roland Crappé's raids on Portuguese colonies	Denmark-Norway; Kingdom of KandySupported by: Thanjavur Nayak kingdom	Portuguese Ceylon Portuguese India	Defeat
1618–1648	Thirty Years' War	Protestant States and Allies Sweden; Kingdom of France; Bohemia; Denmark–Norway (1625–1629); Saxony; Dutch Republic; Electorate of the Palatinate; Brunswick-Lüneburg; England; Scotland; Brandenburg-Prussia; Transylvania; Hungarian Anti-Habsburg Rebels; Zaporozhian Cossacks; Ottoman Empire	Roman Catholic States and Allies Holy Roman Empire: Catholic League; Habsburg Monarchy Austria; Bavaria; Spain and its possessions Denmark–Norway (1643–1645)	Defeat: Peace of Westphalia; Habsburg supremacy curtailed; Rise of the Bourbon dynasty; Rise of the Swedish Empire; Decentralization of the Holy Roman Empire; Franco-Spanish War until 1659; Substantial decline in the power and influence of the Catholic Church
1624	Siege of Dansborg (1624)	Danish India	Thanjavur Nayak	Victory: Thanjavur recognizes Tranquebar as Danish
1627	Turkish Abductions	Denmark-Norway	Ottoman Empire	Defeat: Abduction of 400-800 Icelanders
1642–1698	Dano-Mughal War	Denmark–Norway	Mughal Empire	Peace treaty: Dannemarksnagore ceded to Denmark for 30,000 rupees to be paid over ten years
1643–1645	Torstenson War	Denmark–Norway; Holy Roman Empire	Sweden; Dutch Republic	Defeat: Treaty of Brömsebro (1645)
1644	Conflict between Willem Leyel and Bernt Pessart	Danish India	(Denmark–Norway) Leyel loyalist (Dutch East India Company) Dutch Coromandel English Madras (Portuguese Empire) Portuguese Carical Supported by: Thanjavur Nayak	Willem victory: Willem Leyel becomes governor of Tranquebar
1644	Siege of Dansborg (1644)	Denmark-Norway	Thanjavur Nayak kingdom	Inconclusive
1655–1669	Sieges of Tranquebar (1655–1669)	Danish India	Thanjavur Nayak kingdom	Victory: Villages of Poreiar, Tillali and Erikutanchery ceded to the Danes
1657–1660	Second Northern War	Habsburg monarchy Poland–Lithuania; Russia (1656–58); Brandenburg-Prussia; Dutch Republic	Sweden; Brandenburg-Prussia; Transylvania; Ukrainian Cossacks; Wallachia; Moldavia	Defeat: Treaty of Roskilde (February 26, 1658)
1657–1658	Dano-Swedish War (1657–1658)	Denmark-Norway (Polish–Lithuanian Commonwealth) Poland–Lithuania	(yes) Swedish Empire	Defeat Decisive Swedish victory; Treaty of Roskilde/Treaty of Taastrup
1658–1660	Dano-Swedish War (1658–1660)	Denmark–Norway; Dutch Republic; Brandenburg-Prussia; Poland–Lithuania; Habsburg Monarchy	(yes) Swedish Empire	Victory: Treaty of Copenhagen (1660)
1660–1664	Dano-Dutch Colonial War in Guinea	Denmark–Norway; Kingdom of England; Fetu tribe	Dutch Republic	Victory: Anglo-Danish Conquest of Cape Coast
1665–1667	Second Anglo-Dutch War: Battle of Vågen	Dutch Republic; Denmark-Norway; Kingdom of France	Kingdom of England; Bishopric of Münster	Victory: Treaty of Breda (1667)
1666	Second Swedish War on Bremen	Bremen; Electorate of Cologne; Brunswick-Lüneburg; Denmark-Norway; Electorate of Brandenburg; Dutch Republic	Sweden	Draw: Treaty of Habenhausen
1675–1679	Scanian War	Denmark-Norway; Dutch Republic; Holy Roman Empire; Brandenburg	Sweden; Kingdom of France	Status quo ante bellum: Treaty of Fontainebleau (1679)
1678	Assault on Osu	Ga-Adangbe; Denmark-Norway	Akwamu	Victory: Assault repelled
1686	Siege of Hamburg (1689)	Denmark–Norway: supported by Kingdom of France	Hamburg; Brunswick-Lüneburg; Brandenburg-Prussia	Peace agreement: Danish withdrawal; Hamburg pays 300,000 thalers as compensation to Denmark

== 1700–1799 ==
Year	War	Belligerents (excluding Denmark)		Outcome
Year	War	Allies	Enemies	Outcome
1700–1720	Great Northern War	Tsardom of Russia; Electorate of Saxony; Poland–Lithuania; Cossack Hetmanate; Prussia (Province of Hanover) Hanover; Great Britain; Denmark–Norway	Sweden; Holstein-Gottorp; Poland–Lithuania; Ottoman Empire	Victory: Treaty of Frederiksborg (1720)
1703–1711	Rákóczi's War of Independence	Holy Roman Empire: Austria; Prussia; Margraviate of Baden; Serbs from Vojvodina; Transylvanian Saxons; Kingdom of Croatia; Royalists; Denmark–Norway	Kuruc forces (Kingdom of Hungary); Principality of Transylvania; Kingdom of France	Victory
1733–1734	1733 slave insurrection on St. John	Denmark–Norway: Sankt Jan	Rebel slaves	Victory: Rebellion suppressed
1739	Battle of Jakobshavn	Denmark–Norway	Dutch Republic	Victory: Dutch presence on Greenland collapses
1765	Strilekrigen	Denmark-Norway	Norwegian peasants	Victory: Rebellion suppressed
1756	Cattle War	Denmark–Norway	Thanjavur Maratha kingdom	Defeat: Punitive expedition unsuccessful
1763	Siege and occupation of serampore	Denmark–Norway	Great Britain	Defeat: Serampore temporarily occupied by Great Britain
1770–1772	Danish–Algerian War	Denmark–Norway	Dey of Algiers	Defeat: Punitive expedition unsuccessful.; Denmark–Norway pays higher tribute than before
1771	Royal Life Guards' Mutiny	Denmark-Norway	Royal Life Guard	execution of Struensee
1784	Sagbadre War	Denmark-Norway Ada-Danish Alliance: Danish West India Company; Little Popo; Ada; Accra; Akuapem; Akwapim; Ga; Krobo	Anlo Confederacy	Victory: Return of territory previously acquired by Anlo from the Alliance; Construction of Fort Prinzenstein
1786–1787	Lofthusreisingen	Denmark-Norway	Norwegian peasants	Victory: Rebellion suppressed
1788–1789	Theatre War	Denmark-Norway	Sweden	Defeat
1788–1790	Russo-Swedish War	Russian Empire	Sweden	Status quo ante bellum
1797	Action of 16 May 1797	Denmark-Norway	Ottoman Empire (de jure): Eyalet of Tripolitania	Victory

== 1800–1945 ==
Year	War	Belligerents (excluding Denmark)		Outcome
Year	War	Allies	Enemies	Outcome
1800–1802	Lærdal Rebellion	Denmark-Norway	Norwegian peasants	Victory: Rebellion suppressed
1800–1813	Napoleonic Wars	France; Ottoman Empire	United Kingdom; Sweden; Russia; Austrian Empire; Prussia; Spain; Portugal; Ottoman Empire (until 1803); United Kingdom of the Netherlands	Defeat: Congress of Vienna (1815)
1801, 1807–1814	English Wars	Denmark–Norway French Empire; Spain	United Kingdom Sweden	Defeat: Treaty of Kiel; Denmark joined the anti-Napoleonic alliance; Frederick VI of Denmark cedes Norway to Sweden
1805–1810	Franco-Swedish War	(First French Empire) French Empire; Spain Until 1808; Holland; Russian Empire (1808–09); Denmark–Norway (1808–09)	Sweden; (United Kingdom of Great Britain and Ireland) United Kingdom; (Kingdom of Prussia) Prussia; Russian Empire (–1807); Austrian Empire; Saxony	Victory: Treaty of Paris (1810); Sweden regains Swedish Pomerania Sweden integrates the Continental System
1807–1814	Gunboat War	Denmark–Norway	United Kingdom	Defeat
1808–1809	Dano-Swedish War (1808–09)	Denmark–Norway; France	Sweden; United Kingdom	Stalemate: Return to Status quo ante bellum
1809	Jørgen Jørgensen's Revolution	Denmark-Norway; United Kingdom	Iceland	Victory: Imprisonment of Jørgen Jørgensen
1808–1981	Huéscar-Danish War	Denmark	Huéscar	Peace treaty
1813-1814	Dano-Swedish War (1813–1814)	Denmark-Norway	Sweden; Russian Empire; Hanover; United Kingdom	Defeat: Denmark cedes Norway to Sweden; Sweden cedes Swedish Pomerania to Denmark
1815	War of the Seventh Coalition	United Kingdom of Great Britain and Ireland; Prussia; Austrian Empire; Russian Empire; Kingdom of Hanover; Brunswick; Sweden; Kingdom of Spain; Kingdom of Portugal; Kingdom of Sardinia; Kingdom of Sicily; Switzerland; Liechtenstein; Denmark; Bourbon Restoration; United Kingdom of the Netherlands	First French Empire; Kingdom of Naples	Victory: Congress of Vienna
1825	Capture of the sloop Anne	Tri-national anti-piracy alliance: Denmark; Spain; United States	Roberto Cofresí's pirates	Victory: Anne (El Mosquito) is disabled; pirates flee ashore
1826	Katamanso War	Denmark; United Kingdom; Netherlands	Ashanti Empire	Victory
1848	1848 Saint Croix slave rebellion	Denmark	Saint Croix slaves	Defeat: emancipation of the Saint Croix slaves
1848–1850	First Schleswig War	Denmark	Prussia; Duchy of Holstein; German Empire	Victory: London Protocol
1864	Second Schleswig War	Denmark	German Confederation: Austrian Empire; Prussia	Defeat: Treaty of Vienna (1864)
1878	Fireburn	Denmark; Supported by United Kingdom; United States; France	Queens of the Fireburn Labor Rioters	Victory: Rebellion ended; deaths of 60 black laborers; 879 acres were burned
1939–1940	Phoney War; World War II	France; Norway; United Kingdom	Nazi Germany; Kingdom of Italy	Stalemate
1940	Operation Weserübung; World War II	Norway; Denmark; United Kingdom; France; Poland	Nazi Germany	Defeat: German forces occupy Denmark.
1940–1945	Occupation of Denmark; World War II	United Kingdom; Soviet Union	Hungary; Nazi Germany	Victory: German forces withdrew at the end of World War II following their surrender to the Allies on 5 May 1945.
1940–1945	Danish resistance movement	Danish resistance groups Denmark (from 1943)	(Denmark) Occupation Government (until 1943) (Nazi Germany) Germany	Victory: Liberation of Denmark
1941–1942	Operation Barbarossa	(Nazi Germany) Germany (Note: Germany's allies, in total, provided a significant number of troops and material to the front. There were also numerous units under German command recruited in German-occupied Europe and sympathetic puppet or neutral states, including the Spanish Blue Division, the Legion of French Volunteers Against Bolshevism, and the 369th Croatian Infantry Regiment.); Free Corps Denmark; Romania; Finland; Italy; Hungary; Slovakia	Soviet Union	Defeat
1945–1946	Soviet occupation of Bornholm	Denmark	USSR	Victory: Soviet withdrawal

== 1946–present ==
Year	War	Belligerents (excluding Denmark)		Outcome
Year	War	Allies	Enemies	Outcome
1950–1953	Korean War	South Korea; United States; United Nations	North Korea; China	Ceasefire
1956	United Nations Emergency Force	United Nations	Egypt United Kingdom; France; Israel	Peace: The conflict resulted in a military victory for the Coalition, but a political victory for Egypt.; Egypt maintained control of the canal.
1958	United Nations Observation Group in Lebanon (UNOGIL), as part of the 1958 Lebanon crisis	United Nations	Lebanon	Concluded
1964–present	United Nations Peacekeeping Force in Cyprus	UNFICYP	Republic of Cyprus Turkish Republic of Northern Cyprus	Ongoing
1973–2022	Whiskey War	Kingdom of Denmark: Greenland	Canada	Stalemate: Division of Hans Island
1988–1991	United Nations Iran–Iraq Military Observer Group, as part of the Iran–Iraq War	United Nations	Iran Iraq	Victory: end of hostilities
1989–1990	United Nations Transition Assistance Group	United Nations	South West Africa	Victory: The Namibian transition to democracy succeeds
1990–1991	Gulf War	Australia; Bahrain; Bangladesh; Belgium; Canada; Egypt; France; Italy; Kuwait; Morocco; Netherlands; Denmark; Norway; Oman; Pakistan; Qatar; Saudi Arabia; Senegal; Spain; Sweden; Syria; United Arab Emirates; United Kingdom; United States other allies	Iraq; Republic of Kuwait	Victory
1991–2003	United Nations Iraq–Kuwait Observation Mission	United Nations	Iraq Kuwait	Victory: Completed
1992–1997	Tajikistani Civil War	Tajikistan: Popular Front of Tajikistan; Communist Party of Tajikistan; Socialist Party of Tajikistan; Russia; Uzbekistan; Kazakhstan; Kyrgyzstan; UNMOT: Austria; Bangladesh; Bulgaria; Czech Republic; Denmark; Ghana; Hungary; Indonesia; Jordan; Nepal; Nigeria; Poland; Switzerland; Ukraine; Uruguay; Supported by: Belarus (weapons supplies)	United Tajik Opposition: Islamic Renaissance Party; Democratic Party; Party of People's Unity; Rastokhez Popular Movement; Lali Badakhshan; Gorno-Badakhshan; Jamiat-e Islami (until 1996); Afghanistan (until 1996); Hezb-e Islami Gulbuddin (until 1996); Taliban factions (Note: The Islamic Emirate of Afghanistan, which was headed by the Taliban and governed 90 percent of Afghanistan, officially declared their neutrality in the conflict, though several Taliban factions went on to fight on the side of the opposition nonetheless.); Supported by: al-Qaeda; Islamic Movement of Uzbekistan; Iran (alleged, denied)	Military Stalemate
1992–1995	Bosnian War (Operation Bøllebank)	Croatia; Bosnia and Herzegovina; NATO	FR Yugoslavia	Victory: Dayton Accords
1992–1993	United Nations Transitional Authority in Cambodia (UNTAC)	United Nations (United Nations Transitional Authority in Cambodia) Cambodia	KPRAF; Khmer Rouge	Monarchy restored
1993–1995	United Nations Operation in Somalia II	UNOSOM II: Algeria; Australia; Austria; Bangladesh; Belgium; Botswana; Canada; Denmark; Egypt; Fiji; Finland; France; Germany; Greece; India; Indonesia; Ireland; Italy; Jordan; Kuwait; Malaysia; Morocco; Nepal; New Zealand; Nigeria; Norway; Pakistan; Philippines; Romania; Saudi Arabia; South Korea; Spain; Sweden; Switzerland; Tunisia; Turkey; UAE; United Kingdom; United States; Zimbabwe	(Somalia) Somali National Alliance; Al-Itihaad al-Islamiya	Defeat: UNOSOM II failure
1994–1996	United Nations Confidence Restoration Operation in Croatia	United Nations; Croatia	Socialist Federal Republic of Yugoslavia	Victory: Croatian victory
1996–2002	United Nations Mission of Observers in Prevlaka	United Nations	Socialist Federal Republic of Yugoslavia Croatia	Victory: Completed
1998	United Nations Civilian Police Support Group	UNPOL	Croatian Police	Victory: Peace affirmed
1998–1999	Kosovo War	Albania; Kosovo; NATO	FR Yugoslavia	Victory: Kumanovo Treaty
1998–1999	United Nations Observer Mission in Sierra Leone	United Nations	RUF (Sierra Leone) AFRC (1997–2002); West Side Boys (1998–2000)	Changed to UNAMSIL: The mission was terminated in October 1999
1999	United Nations Mission in East Timor (UNAMET), as part of the East Timor Crisis	United Nations	Indonesia East Timor	Victory: Completed
1999–2005	United Nations Mission in Sierra Leone as part of the Sierra Leone Civil War	United Nations Sierra Leone: SLA (before and after the AFRC); CDF (Kamajors, Tamaboros, Kapras, etc.); Foreign mercenaries; United Kingdom (2000–2002); Guinea; ECOMOG Forces (1998–2000); Executive Outcomes (1995–1996)	RUF (Sierra Leone) AFRC (1997–2002); West Side Boys (1998–2000)	Victory: Commonwealth victory
1999–2010	United Nations Organization Mission in the Democratic Republic of the Congo (MONUC)	United Nations	Democratic Republic of the Congo	Victory: Peace maintained
1999–2002	United Nations Transitional Administration in East Timor, as part of the East Timor Crisis	UNTAET	Indonesia East Timor	Victory: Completed
2000–2008	United Nations Mission in Ethiopia and Eritrea	United Nations	Ethiopia Eritrea	abandonment: The mission was formally abandoned in July 2008; Mission completed
2002–2021	War in Afghanistan	AfghanistanDenmark; Armenia; Austria; Azerbaijan; Bosnia and Herzegovina; Finland; Georgia (country); Jordan; Macedonia; Montenegro; NATO; Sweden; Ukraine; Australia; Malaysia; Mongolia; New Zealand; Singapore; South Korea; Switzerland; Tonga; United Arab Emirates; United Kingdom	(Afghanistan) Taliban al-Qaeda	Defeat: Defeat of Taliban forces briefly before Taliban retook the region in 2021.
2002–2011	Operation Enduring Freedom – Horn of Africa; Part of the war on terrorism	Australia; China; Djibouti; Ethiopia; India; Japan; Kenya; Malaysia; NATO; New Zealand; Russia; Seychelles; Singapore; Somalia; South Korea; Sweden; Uganda; Ukraine; Denmark	al-Qaeda	Victory
2003–2011	Iraq War	Armenia; Australia; Azerbaijan; Bosnia and Herzegovina; Dominican Republic; El Salvador; Georgia (country); Honduras; Iraq; Japan; Kazakhstan (Kurdistan Region) Peshmerga; Macedonia; Moldova; Mongolia; NATO; New Zealand; Nicaragua; Philippines; Poland; Singapore; South Korea; Thailand; Ukraine; United Kingdom; United States	Baath Party Loyalists Islamic State of Iraq al-Qaeda in Iraq; Mahdi Army	Victory: Danish withdrawal in 2008
2005–2011	United Nations Mission in Sudan	United Nations	Sudan SPLA	Victory: Legal status: Accomplished
2007–2010	United Nations Mission in the Central African Republic and Chad (MINURCAT), as part of Darfur Conflict, Civil war in Chad (2005–2010)	United Nations	(Sudan) Sudanese rebel groups	Inactive
2009–2016	Operation Ocean Shield	Somalia; United States; United Kingdom; Denmark; Netherlands; Spain; Greece; Germany; Belgium; Canada; Italy; Portugal; Turkey; Norway; Australia; India; New Zealand; Japan; Saudi Arabia; Ukraine; South Korea	(Somalia) Somali Pirates	Victory: Number of Somali pirate attacks have been reduced dramatically
2011	2011 Libyan Civil War	Jordan (Libya) National Transitional Council; NATO; Qatar; United Arab Emirates; United Kingdom; United States; Sweden	Libyan Arab Jamahiriya	Victory: Overthrow of Gaddafi government; UN, EU, AL and AU diplomatically recognise the National Transitional Council as the sole governing authority for Libya
2011–present	United Nations Mission in South Sudan	United Nations	South Sudan Sudan	Ongoing
2013–2023	United Nations Multidimensional Integrated Stabilization Mission in Mali, as part of the Mali War	United Nations; Mali; Russia (since 2021); France (2013–22)	Coordination of Azawad Movements (CMA); Al-Qaeda and allies	Defeat: Dissolved
2014–present	Military intervention against ISIL	United States; Canada (2014–17); Belgium (2014–17); Sweden; Germany; Italy; Turkey (2014–17); Netherlands; Jordan; Morocco (2014–16); United Kingdom	ISIL	Ongoing
2023–present	Operation Prosperity Guardian	United States; United Kingdom; Australia; Bahrain; Canada; Denmark; Greece; Netherlands; Norway; Singapore; Sri Lanka; Supported by: Seychelles	Yemen (SPC): Houthi movement	Ongoing

== See also ==
- Dano-Swedish war (disambiguation)
- List of Danish monarchs
- List of Danish regiments
- List of wars
- List of battles
- Military history of Denmark
