= Siege of Älvsborg (1563) =

1563 siege between Denmark and Sweden

Coordinates: 57°40′29″N 11°51′8″E

- Part of the Northern Seven Years' War
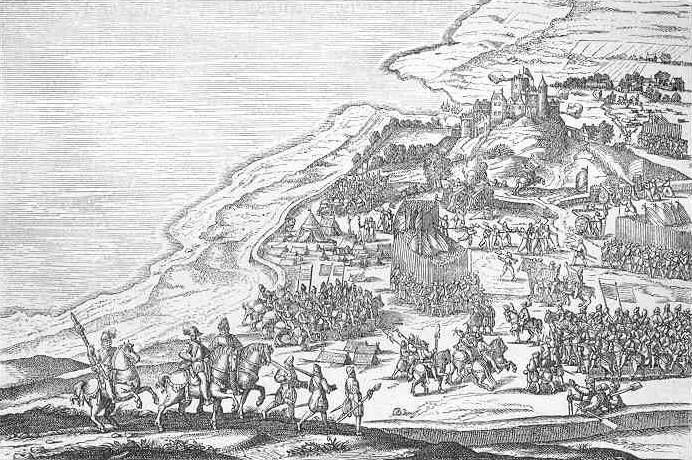
- Frederick II conquers Älvsborg, by Oskar Alin in 1889
Date	1 – 4 September 1563
Location	Älvsborg Fortress, Västra Götaland, Sweden
Result	Danish victory
Territorial changes	Göta älv secured by Denmark-Norway

Belligerents
Denmark-Norway	Sweden

Commanders and leaders
(Denmark–Norway) Frederick II (Denmark–Norway) Daniel Rantzau (Denmark–Norway) Günther XLI	(History of Sweden (1523–1611)) Erik Kagge (surrendered)

Units involved
(Denmark–Norway) Rantzau's Regiment	(History of Sweden (1523–1611)) Älvsborg garrison

Strength
Unknown, but large	700 men 32 cannons

Casualties and losses
Unknown	2 ships taken 32 cannons taken

The siege of Älvsborg (Swedish: Belägringen av Älvsborg), also known as the siege of Elfsborg (Danish: Belejringen af Elfsborg), was a siege of the Swedish fortress of Älfsborg by the Danish army under King Frederick II at the start of the Northern Seven Years' War. The siege ended in a quick Danish victory, and the Swedish commander would surrender the fort before any direct assault would be initiated.

== Background ==
In August 1563, the Northern Seven Years' War began. Frederick II of Denmark was stationed in Scania with 28,000 men and began marching up to Älvsborg Fortress, supported by 27 large warships which left Copenhagen on 5 August with a further 4,600 men.

Älvsborg Fortress was one of Sweden's most important fortifications, and from here you could control shipping from places further inland, like Lödöse. Therefore, it was of strategic importance to control the fortress, and if Frederick were to take the castle it would be a big blow to Sweden.

On 22 August, the Danish army reached Älvsborg, made camp, and surrounded the fortress.

== Siege ==
On 22 August, the Danish army made camp at Älvsborg and surrounded the fortress. The Swedes awaited the attack, yet supplies and reinforcements could not be sent to the besieged Swedes. On 1 September, the Danes were ready and the siege began. Under Erik Kagge, the Swedish garrison stood at 700 men and 32 cannons of various sizes. The garrison was keen on defending the castle from the Danish artillery, and Frederick II describes an incident from the siege:

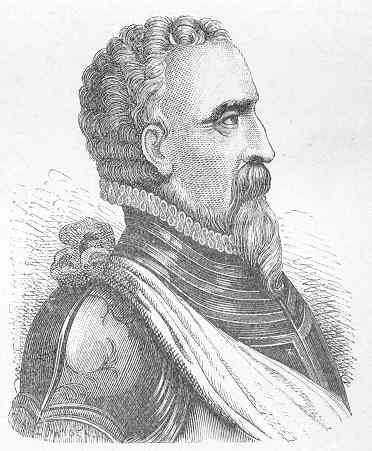
Illustration of Daniel Rantzau, by Oskar Alin in 1889. Rantzau would play a prominent role in the Northern Seven Years' War and be promoted to commander-in-chief.

We [Frederick] were in front of the castle with our colonels and men of war; and (just) as we stood outside one rampart, he shot [the enemy] with half a snake out of the castle us right overhead, not ½ cubit, midway between Count von Schwartzburg and Count Johan of Oldenburg, and the rush of the lot flew right over Jørgen von Holle while he was sleeping, and met one of his generals and broke his arm. Glory be to God who preserved us.

— Frederick II of Denmark

After three days of shooting, the besiegers had made a hole in the fortification, and thereby the fortress could be assaulted. Commander Daniel Rantzau got the task of assaulting the fortification, however before he could do that, Erik Kagge had already surrendered.

== Aftermath ==
After this, the Danes took much booty, including the 32 cannons in the fortress and two warships which would be incorporated into the Danish fleet. Frederick II installed Jørgen Rantzau as commander of the conquered fortress, with a garrison of four companies, later reduced to two. The Danish army would later march south to Halland where it would confront Eric XIV's army.

== See also ==
- Battle of Marstrand – 1677 battle of the Scanian War
- Battle of Mared – 1563 Swedish-Danish battle
- Gothenburg – City in Västergötland, Sweden
- Estonian campaign (1563) – Swedish invasion of Danish Estonia in 1563

== Works cited ==
- Vaupell, Otto (1891). Den nordiske Syvaarskrig 1563-1570 (in Danish). Reitzel. pp. 43–48.
- Frost, Robert I (2000). The Northern Wars - War, State and Society in Northeastern Europe, 1558 - 1721 (PDF). Pearson Education Limited.
- Sundberg, Ulf (2002). Svenska krig 1521-1814 (in Swedish). Hjalmarson & Högberg. p. 47. ISBN 978-91-89660-10-6.
- Lindbergh, Katarina Harrison (2020-08-18). Nordiska sjuårskriget: 1563-1570 (in Swedish). Svenska Historiska Media Förlag. pp. 62–64. ISBN 978-91-7545-540-2.
