= Military history of Denmark =

The Military timeline of Denmark is centered around an involvement in wars in Northern Europe since 793 and, recently, elsewhere.

In the early Middle Ages, Danish Vikings invaded and conquered parts of the British Isles and Normandy. Later in the Middle Ages, Denmark was repeatedly in combat with Scandinavian neighbours and in the Baltic area. The "Union Wars" of the 15th and early 16th centuries took place between Denmark and Sweden, then united in the Kalmar Union. After Sweden broke away, Denmark – until 1814 remaining united with Norway – again confronted Sweden in the Northern Seven Years' War (1563–70) and the Kalmar War (1611–13). Denmark was heavily involved in the Thirty Years' War (1618–1648) on the side of the Protestants of the German lands. During the 16th to 18th centuries, Danish military involvement was also directed against Russia and other Eastern European nations in the series of Northern Wars and subsequent campaigns.

Denmark was brought into the Napoleonic Wars on the French side when attacked by Britain at the Battles of Copenhagen in 1801 and 1807. The eventual defeat of Napoleon led to the break-up of the Denmark-Norway union. The next major combats were over control of Schleswig, in the First and Second Schleswig Wars. The result hereof being that Denmark lost Schleswig, of which the northern part returned in 1920. Denmark remained neutral in World War I, but in World War II the country was occupied, with little fighting, by Nazi Germany in 1940.

As a member of the United Nations and NATO, Denmark has participated in military operations since 1992: in Bosnia, Afghanistan, Iraq and Libya.

== The Viking Age (793–1050) ==
Map depicting the route taken by the Great Danish Army during the Viking invasion of England in the 860s

- 793 – Vikings raid Lindisfarne monastery on Holy Island in the North Sea. This is considered the start of the Viking Raids
- 810 – Frisia is attacked by Danish Vikings
- 855 – Danish Viking army besieges Paris, though never capturing the city
- 866 – Large Danish Viking army arrives in England
- 876 – King Alfred cedes East and North England to the Danes thus establishing the Danelaw
- 911 – Emperor of Western Francia Charles the Simple surrenders what will later be known as Normandy to Viking chief Rollo.
- 920 – The Danelaw is reconquered by England
- 982 – London is sacked by Vikings
- 994 – Sweyn Forkbeard attacks London and is bought off with Danegeld
- 1000 – Sweyn Forkbeard conquers Norway
- 1004 – Danes under Sweyn land in England and sack Exeter, Thetford, and Norwich
- 1013 – "Svend Tveskæg" launch’s a full scale invasion of England and is recognised as the new King of England
- 1014 – North Sea empire established.
- 1014 – The Battle of Clontarf is fought in the region of Howth, near Dublin between the Irish and Viking forces of Brian Boruma and his Viking and Irish opponents. The battle results in an Irish victory on the side of king Brian.
- 1016 – Viking army meets an English army at Ashdon. The battle ends in an English defeat

== Early period ==
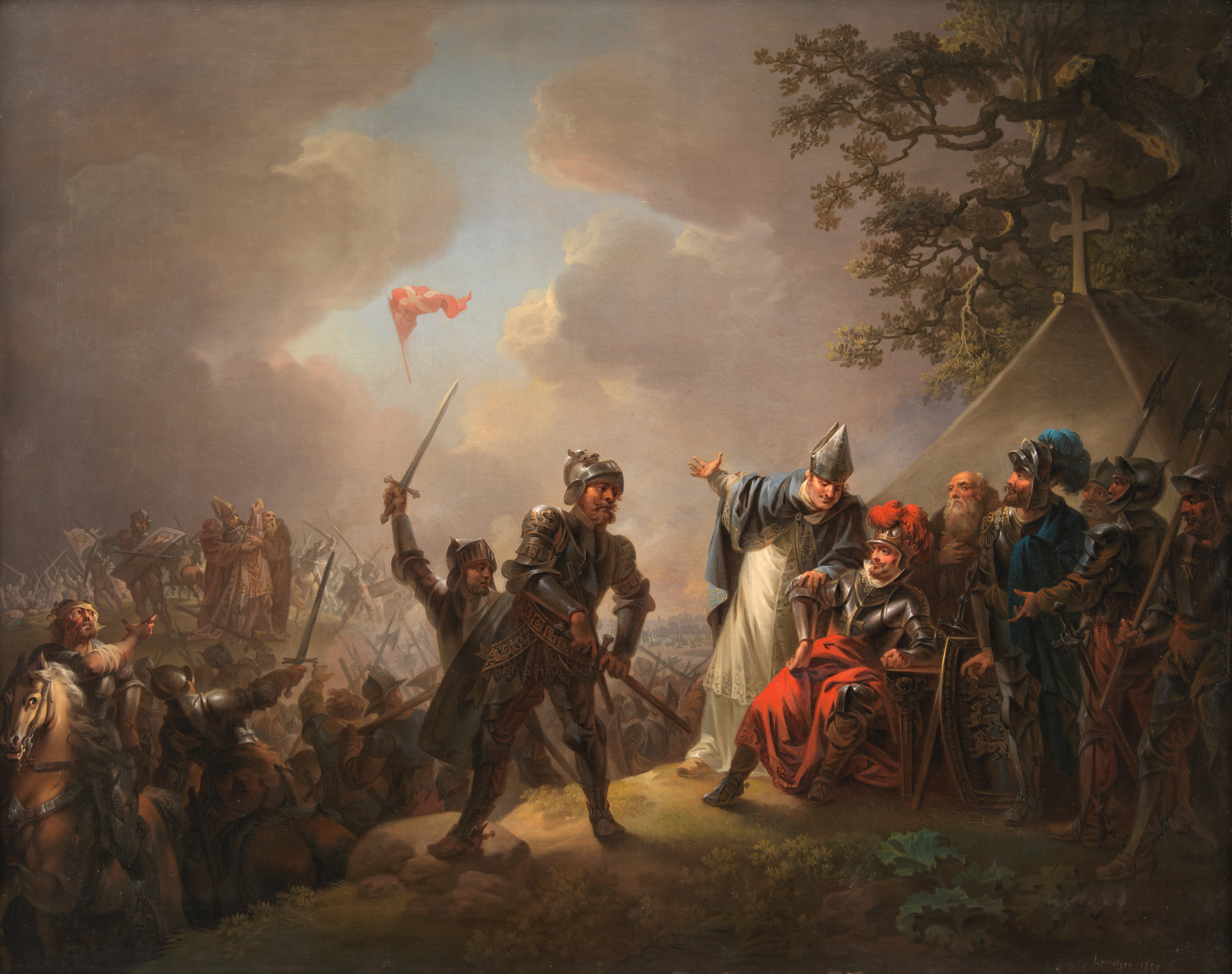
Dannebrog falling from the sky during the Battle of Lyndanisse. According to legend, the flag of Denmark originated from this battle.

- 1043 – Magnus I of Norway defeats the Wends at Lyrskov Hede
- 1069 – Sweyn II of Denmark sponsored a successful Danish attack on England in 1069, aiding Anglo-Saxon rebels against William the Conqueror
- 1157 – 23 October Valdemar I defeats Sven on Grate Hede ending the Danish Civil War
- 1184 – 21 May A Danish fleet of 125 ships under Absalon defeats a Vendish fleet
- 1191 – Danish crusade to Finland
- 1202 – Danish crusade to Finland led by the Archbishop of Lund Anders Sunesen and his brother
- 1219 – 15 June In the Battle of Lindanise in Estonia (what would later be Livonia), the Danish flag falls down from the sky, at least according to legend (see Dannebrog)
- 1362 – Valdemar Atterdag defeats a Hanseatic fleet (see Hanseatic League) that was besieging Helsingborg, and forces Lübeck to conclude peace

== Union Wars (1434–1523) ==
- 1434 – A Swedish peasant rebellion breaks out against the Danes
- 1448 – Disagreements over who should be the new King after Christoffer the Third's death, leads to war between Denmark and Sweden
- 1455 – After 7 years of war Danish King Christian the First is recognised as King over the Union
- 1463 – Another outbreak of rebellion against the Danes in Sweden

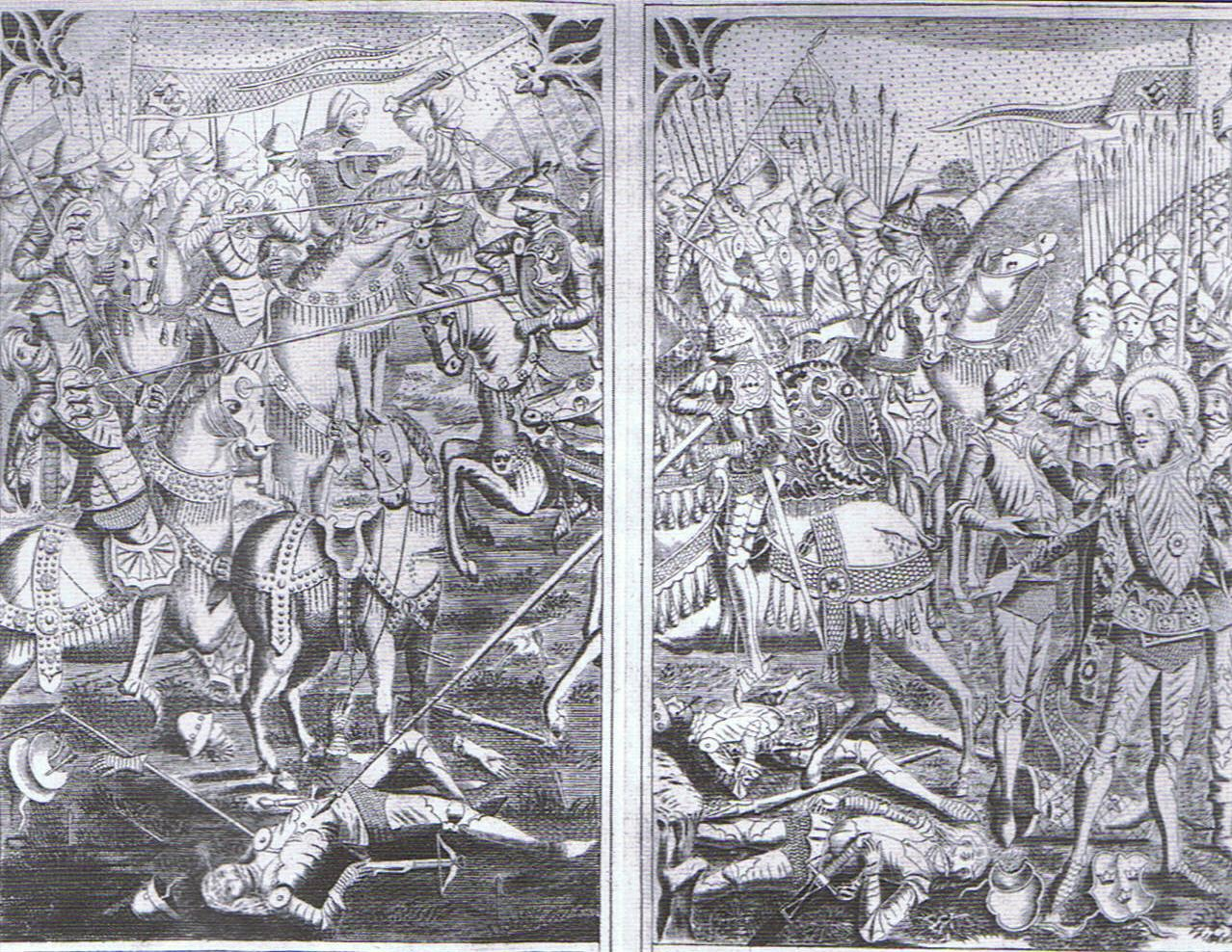
Depiction of the Battle of Brunkeberg in 1471

- 1471 – In the Battle of Brunkeberg, the Danes suffer complete defeat at the hands of the Swedish
- 1472 – Peace is concluded
- 1497 – 29 September King Hans attempts to grab power in Sweden after internal disturbances. His army of German mercenaries defeats a Swedish army in the Battle of Rotebro and he is recognised as King of Sweden
- 1500 – 17 February King Hans is defeated in the battle of Dithmarschen
- 1501 – A Swedish rebellion breaks out and King Hans loses most of Sweden
- 1501 – The Swedes attack Norway but are forced back. Stockholm surrenders to the Swedes
- 1510 – Lübeck declares war on Denmark and Sweden joins Lübeck
- 1511 – 9 August A Danish fleet forces the Lübeck fleet to fall back at Bornholm, and the rest of the war they remain in port
- 1512 – April Denmark concludes peace with Sweden and Lübeck
- 1517 – A rebellion in Sweden flares up again. In August a Danish army is deployed at Stockholm, but is defeated at Vedla
- 1518 – Another Danish army is deployed at Stockholm, but is not capable of forcing a decisive battle
- 1520 – 6 April A Danish army defeats a Swedish peasant army at Uppsala and occupies Stockholm
- 1520 – 8 November The Swedish army is defeated. King Christian the Second acquires the title of King of Sweden, and orders all the Swedish nobility executed. This day is known as the bloodbath in Stockholm
- 1521 – Swedish Gustav Vasa reconquers all of Sweden and the Union is dissolved. Gustav is declared King of Sweden

== War with Lübeck and "The Counts Feud" (1534–1537) ==
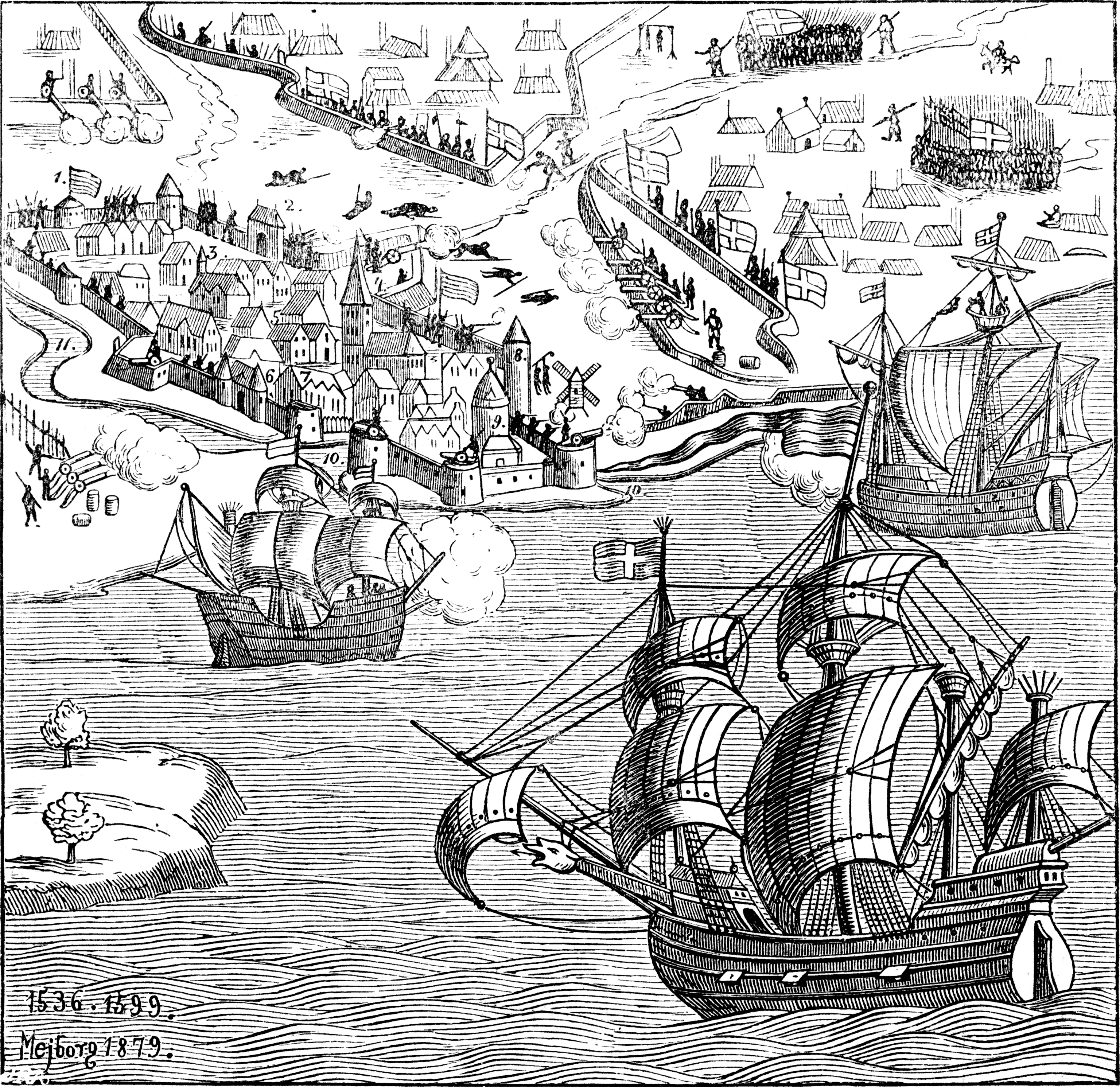
Siege of Copenhagen during the Count's Feud, a war of succession for the Danish throne from 1534 to 1536

- 1534 – A Civil War named the Count's Feud breaks out. Captain Clement raises a Juttish peasant army
- 1535 – 9 June A Danish and Swedish fleet fights a naval battle against Lübeck. The battle ends in a draw but in the coming days the Lübeck fleet is destroyed
- 1536 – 11 June In the Danish Civil War a Danish peasant army is massacred in the battle of Oxnebjerg
- 1537 – 16 January Lübeck concludes peace with Christian the Third. The Civil War ends when Copenhagen surrenders to Christian the Third

== War against The Netherlands (1542–1543) ==
- 1542 – War breaks out between France and the German Emperor. Emperor Charles V supports Frederick II, Elector Palatine for the Danish crown, and Denmark participates in the war on the side of France
- 1543 – Denmark declares war on Netherlands, that are under the rule of Charles
- 1544 – Denmark concludes the Treaty of Speyer with the German Emperor

== Seven Years' War (1563–1570) ==
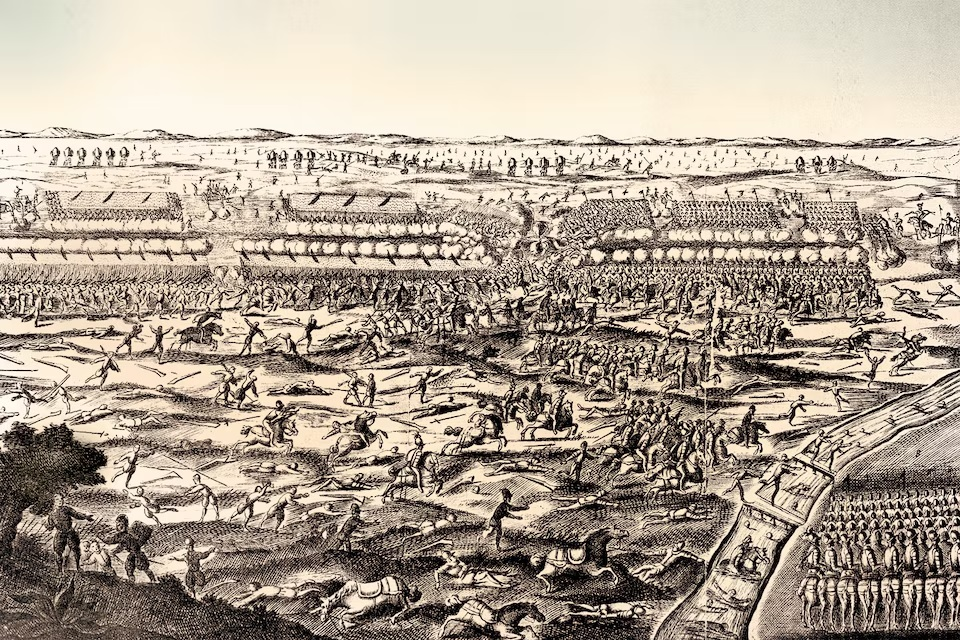
Depiction of the Battle of Axtorna, a battle that took place in 1565, during the Northern Seven Years' War

- 1563 – 31 July Ambition and a fight over the right to each other's national weapons, war breaks out between Denmark and Sweden
- 1563 – 15 September A Danish army moves into Sweden and occupies Älvsborg
- 1564 – 30 May A Danish fleet under the command of Herluf Trolle, defeats a Swedish fleet between Öland and Gotland
- 1565 – 9 October The war's only big battle stands at Axtorna. Rantzau defeats a numerically superior Swedish army
- 13 December 1570– A peace treaty (Treaty of Stettin) is concluded and terminates the war between Denmark and Sweden. Denmark gives back Älvsborg in return for 150.000 daler (Danish coin)

== Kalmar War (1611–1613) ==
- 4 April 1611– War between Denmark and Sweden breaks out when Sweden attempts to break the Danish monopoly on trade with Russia.
- 11 June 1611 – The Swedish Army is defeated at Kalmar.
- 20 January 1613 – Denmark and Sweden sign a peace treaty. Denmark becomes an uncontested power in Scandinavia.

== Thirty Years' War (1618–1648) ==
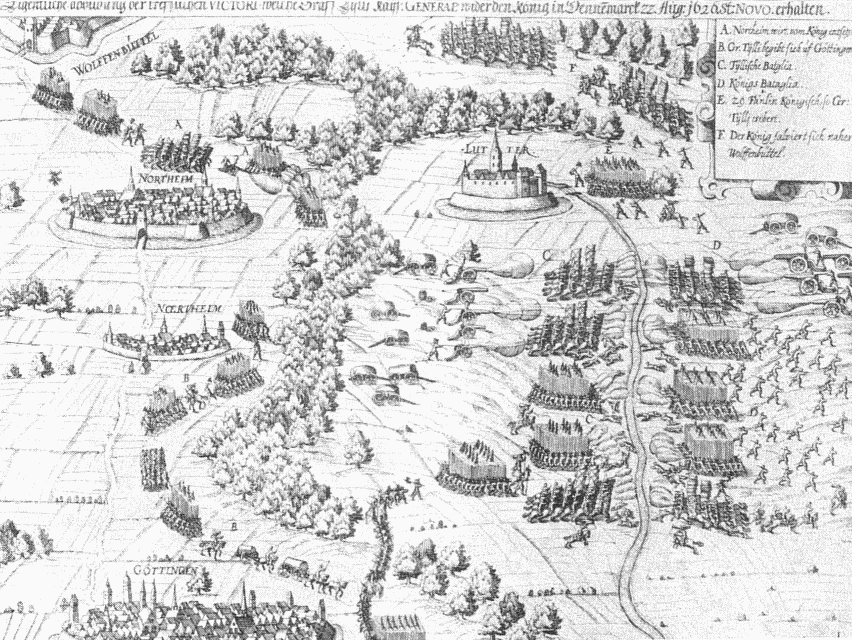
Depiction of the Battle of Lutter, which saw members of the Catholic League defeat an army led by Christian IV of Denmark in 1626

- 1618 – Denmark enters the war between Catholics and Protestants
- 1626 – The Danish Army under Christian IV is defeated by a Catholic army in the Battle of Lutter am Barenberge
- 1628 – In the battle of Wolgast, Christian IV is crushed by a German army and forced to conclude peace

== Torstenson War (1643–1645) ==
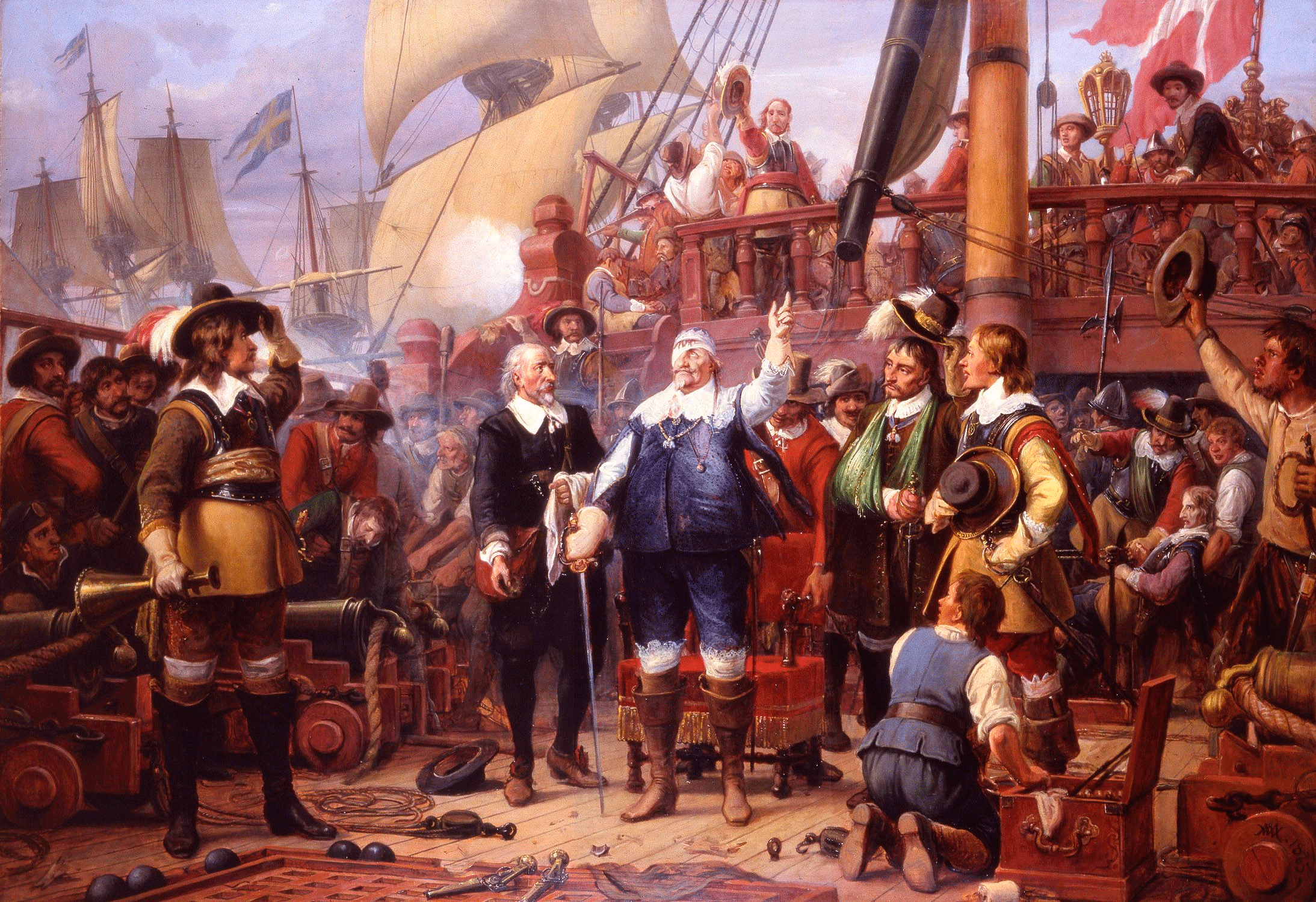
Depiction of Christian IV on the flagship Trefoldigheden in 1644, during the Battle of Colberger Heide

- 1643 – December: War with Sweden breaks out because of a long dispute over the dominance of the Øresund, and dissent over the Øresund toll.
- 1643 – 12 December: The Swedish Field Marshal Thorsteinson crosses the border to Holstein from Swedish territory in North Germany.
- 1644 – January: Jutland is occupied by Swedish troops.
- 1644 – February: Swedish troops under Gustav Horn advance into Skåne and are stopped at Malmö.
- 1644 – 16 May: A Danish fleet defeats a Dutch fleet at Lister Dyb, which was sent to reinforce the Swedes.
- 1644 – 1 July: The Danish Fleet meets the Swedish Fleet at Koldberg Heide. The battle ends in a decisive Danish victory, and the Swedish withdraw to the Kiel Bay.
- 1644 – 12 October: A combined Swedish and Dutch fleet defeats a Danish fleet at Fehmarn. This effectively decides the outcome of the war.
- 1645 – February: Peace negotiations are started in Brømsebro.
- 1645 – 13 August: Denmark and Sweden conclude peace in Brømsebro. Denmark is forced to hand over Gotland, Øsel and Halland (South Sweden) as well as the Norwegian province Jemtland.

== Great Northern War (Store Nordiske Krig) (1700–1720) ==
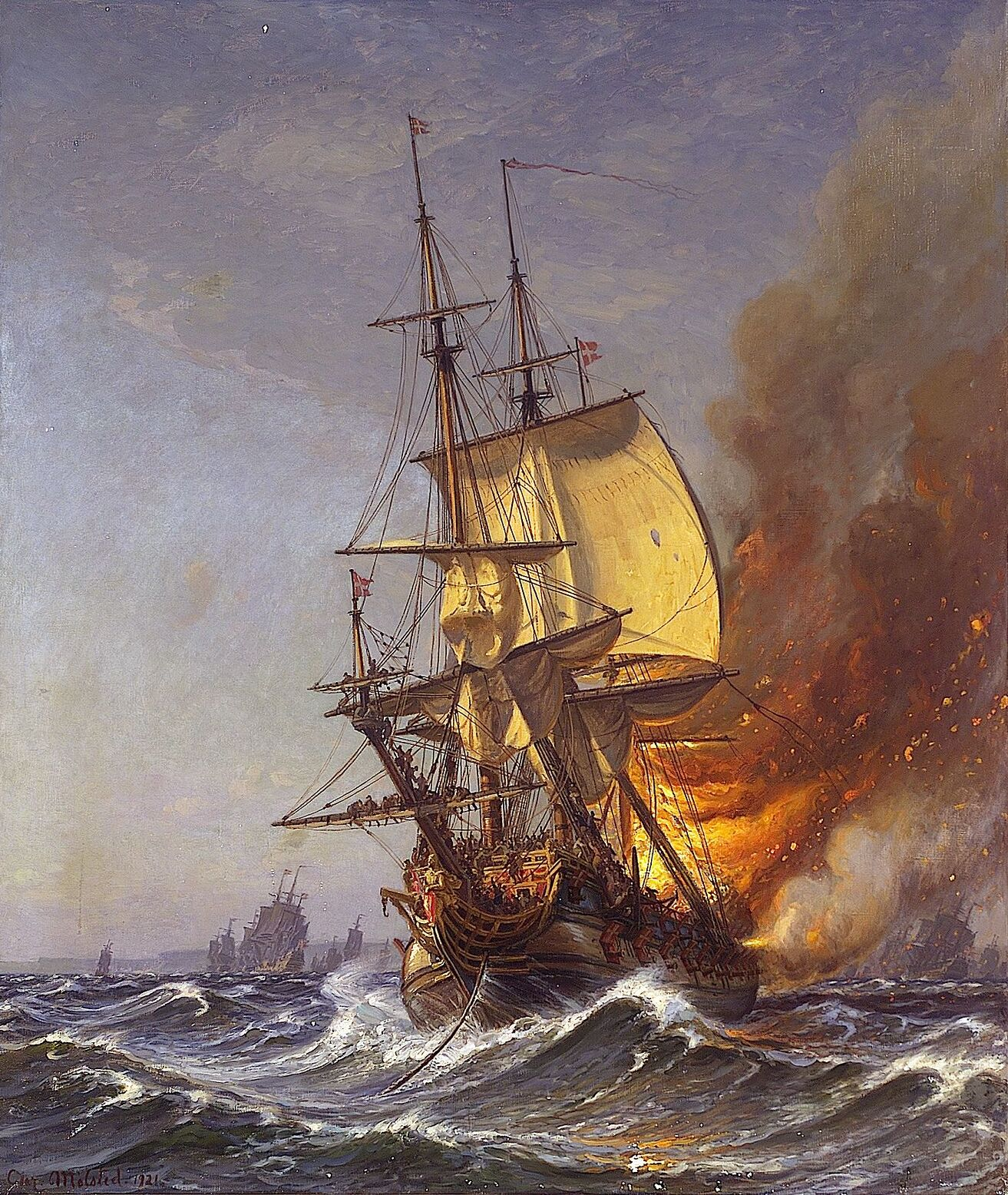
Danish ship of the line Dannebroge on fire, during the Battle of Køge Bay

== Napoleonic Wars (Napeoleonskrigene) (1800–1813) ==
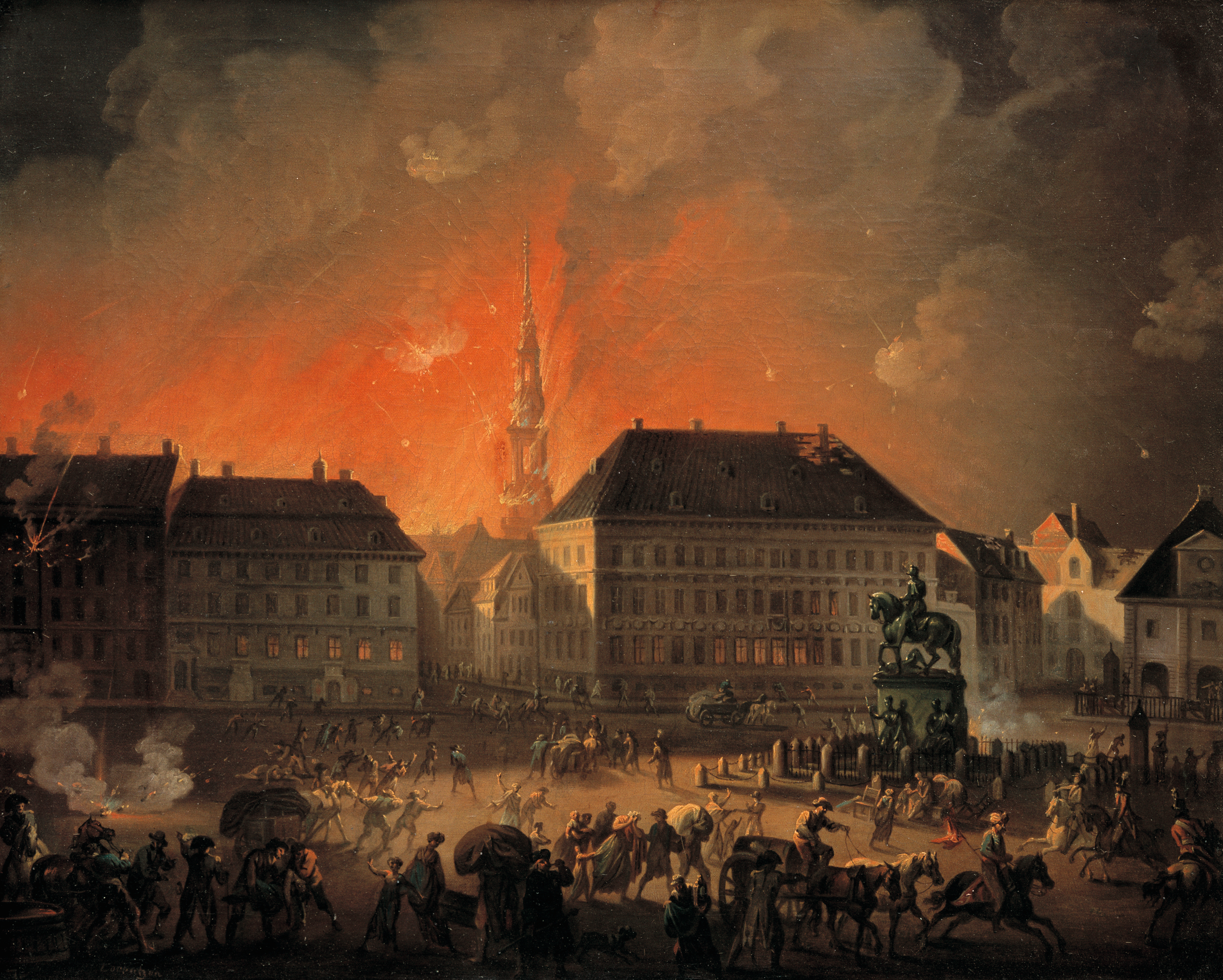
Copenhagen in flames in 1807, during the bombardment of Copenhagen by the British

== German Occupation (Den tyske besættelse) (1940–1945) ==
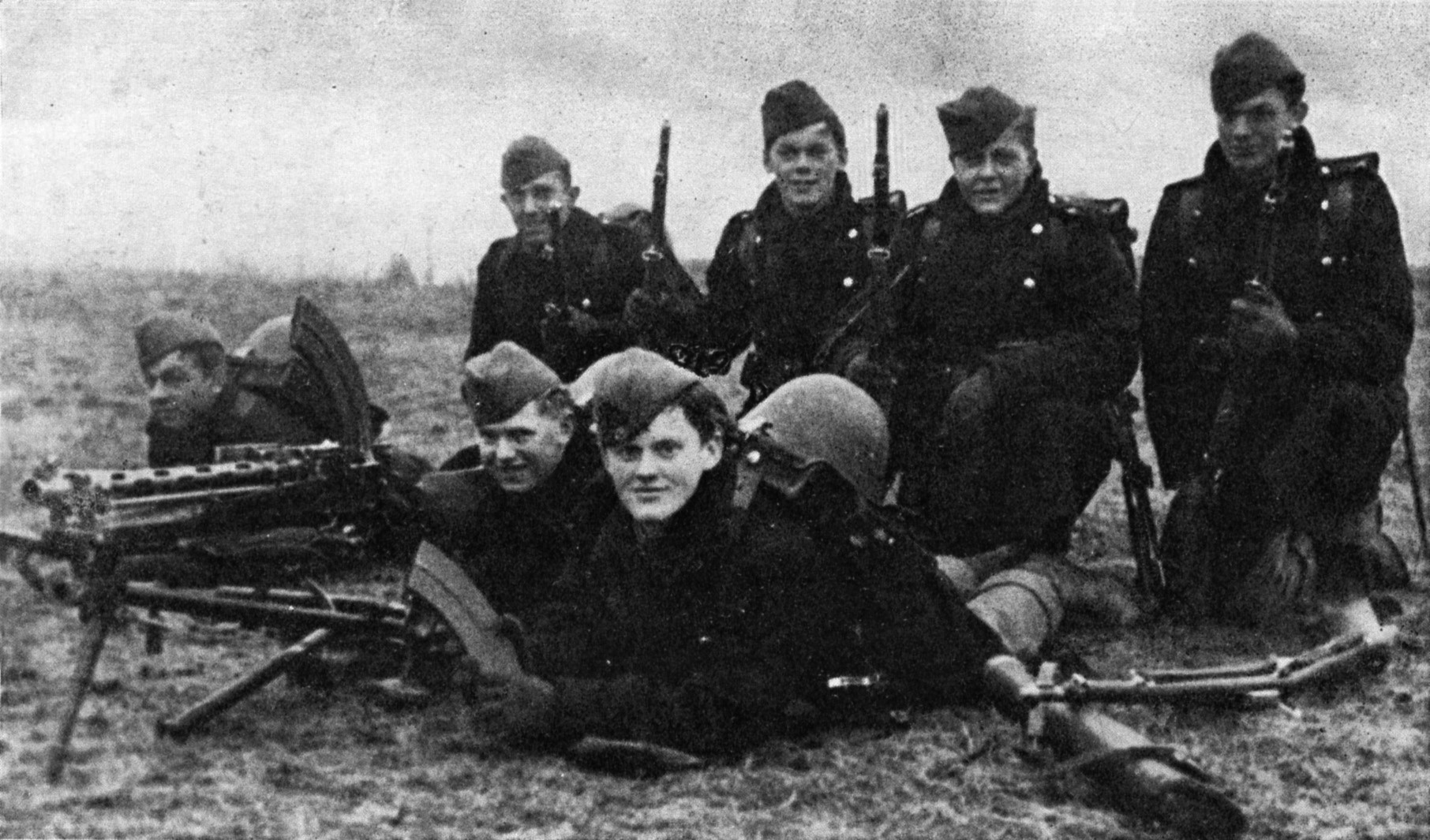
Danish soldiers on the morning of the German invasion of Denmark in 1940

== See also ==
- History of Denmark
- Danish Defence
