= Estonian campaign (1563) =

Swedish invasion of Danish Estonia in 1563

- Part of the Northern Seven Years' War and the Polish–Swedish War (1563–1568)
- Map of Wiek county, where the campaign took place.
Date	August – 30 September, 1563
Location	Wiek, (modern-day Estonia)
Result	Swedish victory
Territorial changes	Leal and Hapsal are occupied by the Swedes

Belligerents
Sweden	Denmark–Norway; Polish–Lithuanian union (Note: Intervened in the first siege of Lode); Courland

Commanders and leaders
(History of Sweden (1523–1611)) Åke Bengtsson	Gotthard Kettler

Units involved
Unknown	(Denmark–Norway) Leal garrison (Denmark–Norway) Hapsal garrison (Denmark–Norway) Lode garrison

Strength
At Hapsal; 450 men At Lode; 2 banners and 3 companies	At Lode; 4 banners of cavalry 2 companies of soldiers 800 Poles and Tatars

Casualties and losses
Unknown	Unknown

The Estonian campaign, also called the Swedish offensive in Estonia (Swedish: Svenska offensiven i Estland) was a Swedish offensive against land controlled by Denmark–Norway in Estonia in 1563, during the campaign, both the Polish–Lithuanian union and Duchy of Courland intervened on the Danish side. The Swedes were able to successfully occupy Leal and Hapsal and furthered their control in Estonia.

== Background ==
During the Northern Seven Years' War, the mutual ravages by both the Danes and Swedes in southern Scandinavia and their struggle over Älvsborg and Halmstad took up much of both of their treasuries. However, the war also had a Baltic theatre. Both Denmark and Sweden had acquired territory in Estonia, and both sides wished to expand their influence there.

However, the Danish position was much weaker than the Swedish one, as the Swedes could more easily send reinforcements to their holdings in Estonia from Finland, while the commanders on Ösel were being consistently deprived of support by Copenhagen. Initially, the commander of the Swedish forces in Estonia was Charles de Mornay, but he was deemed to be more important in Sweden and command was given to Åke Bengtsson Färla instead. He received strict orders from Eric XIV that in the event of a war breaking out between Sweden and Denmark, he was to conquer the Danish possessions in Ösel–Wiek.

Gotthard Kettler

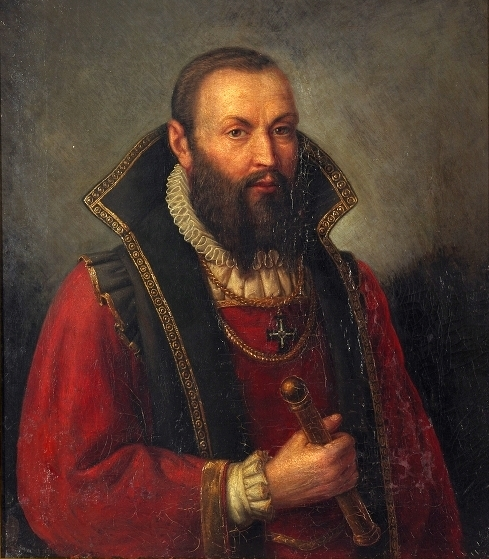
Gotthard Kettler, Duke of Courland and Semgalia (r 1561—87).

== Campaign ==
In the beginning, the Swedish attack went as expected, since the Swedes outnumbered the Danes. Åke managed to besiege and later capture both Hapsal and Leal with around 450 men on the west coast of Estonia in August. This attack granted the Swedes control over the majority of Wiek. After this, however, it got harder for the Swedes, as Denmark's eastern allies, being mainly the Polish–Lithuanian union and the Duchy of Courland, decided to intervene against the Swedes.

When the Swedes besieged Lode in September, Gotthard Kettler and a force of four banners of cavalry, two companies of foot soldiers, and 800 Poles and Tatars attacked the besieging Swedes who had a force of around 2 banners and 3 companies of foot soldiers. Working together, Gotthard and the Poles managed to chase away the besieging troops on 30 September.

Before the Swedes had time to organize for resistance, Polish and German units under Denmark also recaptured Leal. The defense of Leal was given by Gotthard to a number of nobles from Wiek, who had fled to Ösel during the Swedish invasion but were now recalled by Gotthard. Since the Swedish force was so numerous, they were able to quickly repair the damage, and a short time later, the Swedes once more captured Leal.

== Aftermath ==
One of the main reasons behind the quick successes of the Swedes in the Baltic theatre is because neither the Poles or Danes prioritized it. With the only operations done by the Poles for the rest of 1563 being some small operations against the Swedish held fortress of Karkus.

As a consequence for Hapsal and Leal being the most important parts of the Danish holdings in mainland Estonia, the Danish empire was limited to the sea.

== Works cited ==
- Lindbergh, Katarina (2022). Nordiska sjuårskriget [Nordic Seven Years' War] (in Swedish). Historiska media. pp. 76–77. ISBN 9789180500951.
- Sundberg, Ulf (1999). Svenska krig 1521-1814 [Swedish wars 1521-1814] (in Swedish). Stockholm: Hjalmarson & Högberg. pp. 67–68. ISBN 9789189080140.
- Chrispinsson, John (2011-11-28). Den glömda historien : om svenska öden och äventyr i öster under tusen år (in Swedish). Norstedts. ISBN 978-91-1-304374-6.
- Jensen, Frede P. (1982). Danmarks konflikt med Sverige 1563-1570 (in Danish). Den danske historiske forening. ISBN 978-87-87462-19-8.
