= Treaty of Stettin (1570) =

1570 peace treaty between Denmark and Sweden

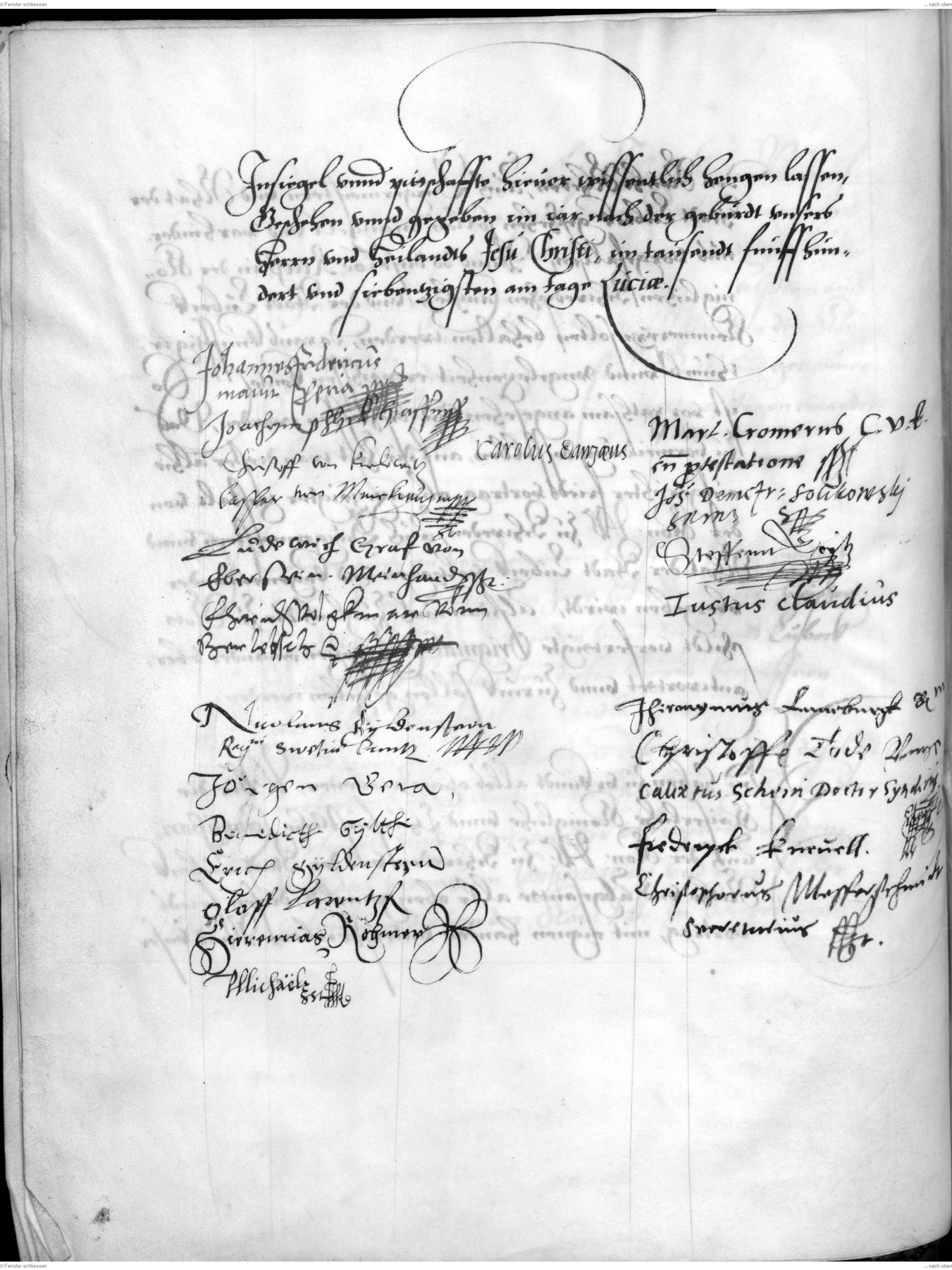
Signature page from the treaty

The Treaty of Stettin (German: Frieden von Stettin, Swedish: Freden i Stettin, Danish: Freden i Stettin) of 13 December 1570, ended the Northern Seven Years' War fought between Sweden and Denmark with its internally fragmented alliance of Lübeck and Poland. It also settled Swedish, Danish, and Holy Roman Imperial claims regarding the Livonian War. Unfavourable for Sweden, the treaty assured Danish hegemony in Northern Europe for a short period. Yet, because of its inconclusiveness, it did not prevent further warfare between Denmark–Norway and Sweden.

== Background ==
The Kalmar Union comprising Sweden, Denmark and Norway, had broken apart in 1523. Frederick II of Denmark attempted to restore the Union under his rule. Frederick underlined his claim by using the Union's three crowns in his coat of arms and invading Sweden in 1563; both actions are considered the starting events of the Seven Years' War. While the Danes had the upper hand in land battles and captured Älvsborg, the Swedes performed better in naval battles and in Livonia, which had been secularized before and now was a subject of territorial competition of the surrounding powers.

== The treaty ==
In July 1570, Maximilian II, Holy Roman Emperor, initiated a peace congress in Stettin (after 1945 Szczecin), aiming to mediate between Sweden and Denmark. Several diplomats acted as mediators: The host, Pomeranian duke Johann Friedrich of Pomerania-Stettin, acted as head of the delegates sent by his emperor, Maximilian; French envoy at the Danish court Charles Dancey, who had been heavily involved in the preparation of the congress, was among the mediators; Martin Kromer, bishop of Warmia (Ermland) and others were sent by the Polish king Sigismund Augustus; Augustus of Saxony attended in person. Of the parties, Denmark was represented by Peder Bille (Bilde), Jørgen Rosenkrantz, Henrik Rantzau, Niels Kaas, and Joachim Henke (Hinck); Sweden sent baron Jöran Gera, Bengt Gylta, Erik Gyllenstjerna (Gyllenstierna), and others.

In the resulting treaty, Sweden and Denmark–Norway agreed on the following:

- The Danish-Norwegian king, Frederick II of Denmark, renounced all claims upon Sweden.
- The Swedish king, John III of Sweden, renounced all pretensions to Norwegian provinces and Gotland. Thus, Sweden acknowledged for the first time Skåne, Blekinge and Halland as Danish provinces.
- Sweden was forced to pay 150,000 riksdaler for the ransom of Älvsborg Castle (Älvsborgs lösen; Elfsborgs løsen). To pay this extraordinarily high amount of money, Sweden heavily taxed all moveables in the country, resulting in further impoverishment of the war-torn population. Unburned towns had to pay one twelfth, peasants one tenth, burned down towns one eighteenth of their properties' value.
- Sweden was also forced to pay 75,000 daler to Lübeck.
- Sweden turned over her possessions in Livonia for a payment by Holy Roman Emperor Maximilian II.

== Outcome ==
With the treaty, Denmark became the supreme and dominating power in Northern Europe for a short period, yet failed to restore the Kalmar Union. The disputes concerning the three crowns insignia remained unsolved, and the unfavorable conditions for Sweden led to a series of future conflicts ending only in 1720/21.

Lübeck gained nothing from the treaty: though granted privileges by Sweden, these did not enhance Lübeck's position as John III of Sweden granted the same privileges to the Pomeranian port of Stralsund, his war-time ally. The payments promised to Lübeck were never transferred. Swedish pirates continued to capture Lübeck's shipments, and the town as well as the whole Hanseatic League had to acknowledge her degradation to a second-class power.

Neither did Maximilian II, Holy Roman Emperor, pay the compensation promised to Sweden, and therefore lost his influence on the Baltic affairs. The terms of the treaty regarding Livonia were ignored, and the contemporary Livonian War dragged on.

Denmark received all payments eventually. John III was determined to keep his only port on the Scandinavian west coast, and his efforts included the sale of warships and devaluation of the Swedish currency.

== See also ==
- List of treaties
- Treaty of Stettin (1630)
- Treaty of Stettin (1653)
- Treaty of Stettin (1715)
