= Battle of Rochester =

Battle between Wessex and the Vikings

Siege of Rochester
- Part of the Viking invasions of England
| Date | 885 AD |
| Location | Rochester, England |
| Result | Anglo-Saxon victory |

Belligerents
| Anglo-Saxons | Norse Vikings |

Commanders and leaders
| King Alfred | Unknown |

Casualties and losses
| Unknown | Unknown |

The Battle of Rochester was an armed conflict between the Anglo-Saxons, under the command of Alfred the Great, and the Norse Viking invaders. The Vikings entered at Medway and attacked Rochester, but were unable to seize the town due to strong resistance. Alfred arrived with an army, which forced some of the Vikings to retreat back to their ships and sail for Francia, while another group of Vikings stayed behind and came to terms with the King.
