= Långedrag =

- District
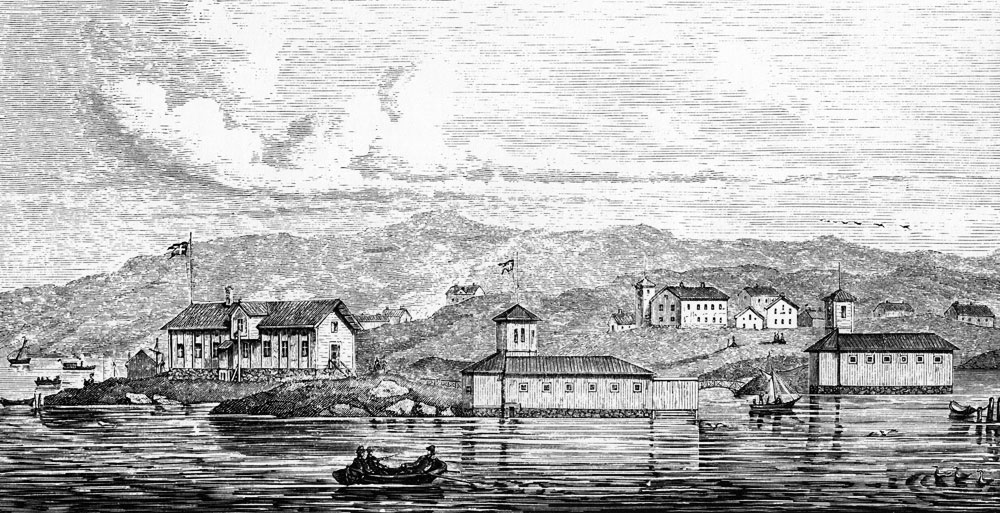

- Location within Sweden
- Coordinates: 57°40′05″N 11°51′13″E
- Country: Sweden
- County: Västra Götaland
- Municipality: Gothenburg

Långedrag (Swedish pronunciation: [ˈlɔ̂ŋːɛˌdrɑːɡ]) is a western district near the sea in Gothenburg, Sweden.
