= Älvsborg Fortress =

Swedish fortification

Coordinates: 57°40′29″N 11°51′8″E

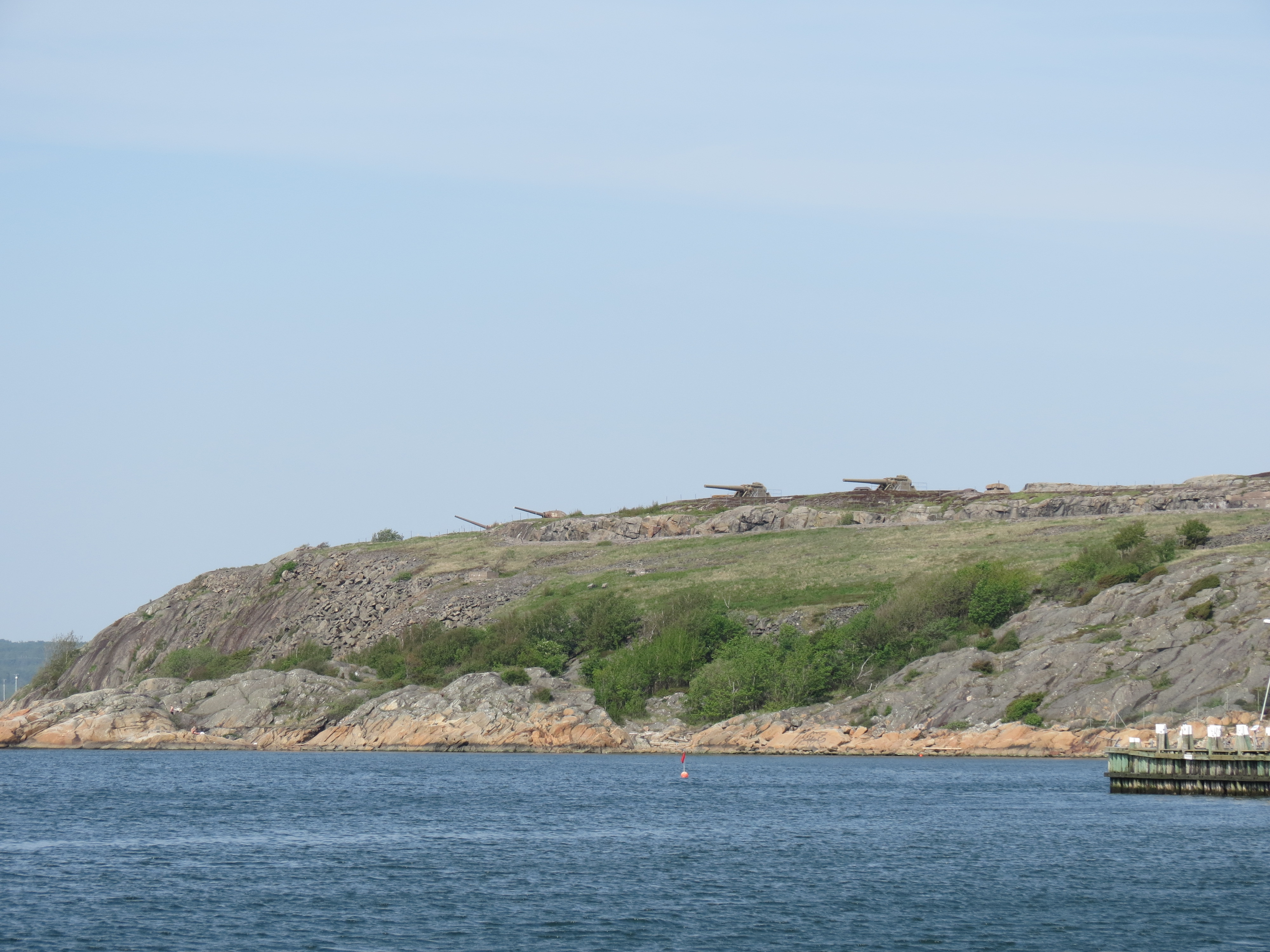
View of Älvsborg Fortress and its coastal artillery guns from the harbor in Långedrag.

Älvsborg Fortress (Swedish: Älvsborgs fästning), with its main facility Oscar II's Fort (Swedish: Oscar II:s fort) built 1899–1907, is a now-defunct Swedish fortification located at the mouth of the Göta River in the Älvsborg district of Gothenburg, Sweden.

== History ==
Construction of the fortress began in 1899 and was completed in modern condition in 1907. In 1904 the name Älvsborg Fortress was given to the new coastal fortress at the mouth of the Göta River, whose strongest fortification, Oscar II's Fort, started construction in 1899 on Västerberget. The fortress, whose task, like previous fortresses, was to secure both Gothenburg and the Port of Gothenburg and the Swedish Navy's rallying point there against attacks from the sea, was in 1907 equipped with new modern artillery guns. The main body of the fortress consisted of two 24 cm guns model of 1904 mounted on disappearing carriages and some 15 cm gun turrets and other light guns. The fort, which is immersed in the basement, encompasses space for 300 people and consists of several hundred meters of walkways with offices, lodgings, messes and stores. The fort's armament was completed in 1907. In addition to naval mines around the flanks, there was also a light battery, the Götiska batteriet ("Geatish Battery") donated by the Geatish Society.

On King Albert I of Belgium's arrival and departure from Gothenburg in connection with the visit of the then Crown Prince Leopold's wedding to Princess Astrid on 4 November 1926, a greeting was fired from Älvsborg Fortress. This was at the same time KA 3's farewell salute and the last salute given by Älvsborg Fortress. On 1 November of the same year, the fortress had already been placed into materiel reserve. Prior to the threatening foreign policy situation, the fortress was put in the defensive state in the fall of 1939. Oscar II's Fort lost its guns in 1939-1940 with the exception of the Götiska batteriet, when they were moved to the main defense line on the outskirts of Gothenburg archipelago. During World War II, the fortress and the fortress area were used for accommodation, etc. In 1942, Älvsborg Fortress was amalgamated into Gothenburg Coastal Artillery Defence, which, with its fortifications, batteries and mine barriers in the Gothenburg archipelago, took over the traditional defence of Gothenburg. Until the 1970s, the fortress spaces were used for storage. Due to a significant deterioration of the internal passages and spaces, the fortress was completely disbanded during the 1970s.

The fortress became a listed building on 15 March 2018.

== Staffing of Älvsborg Fortress ==
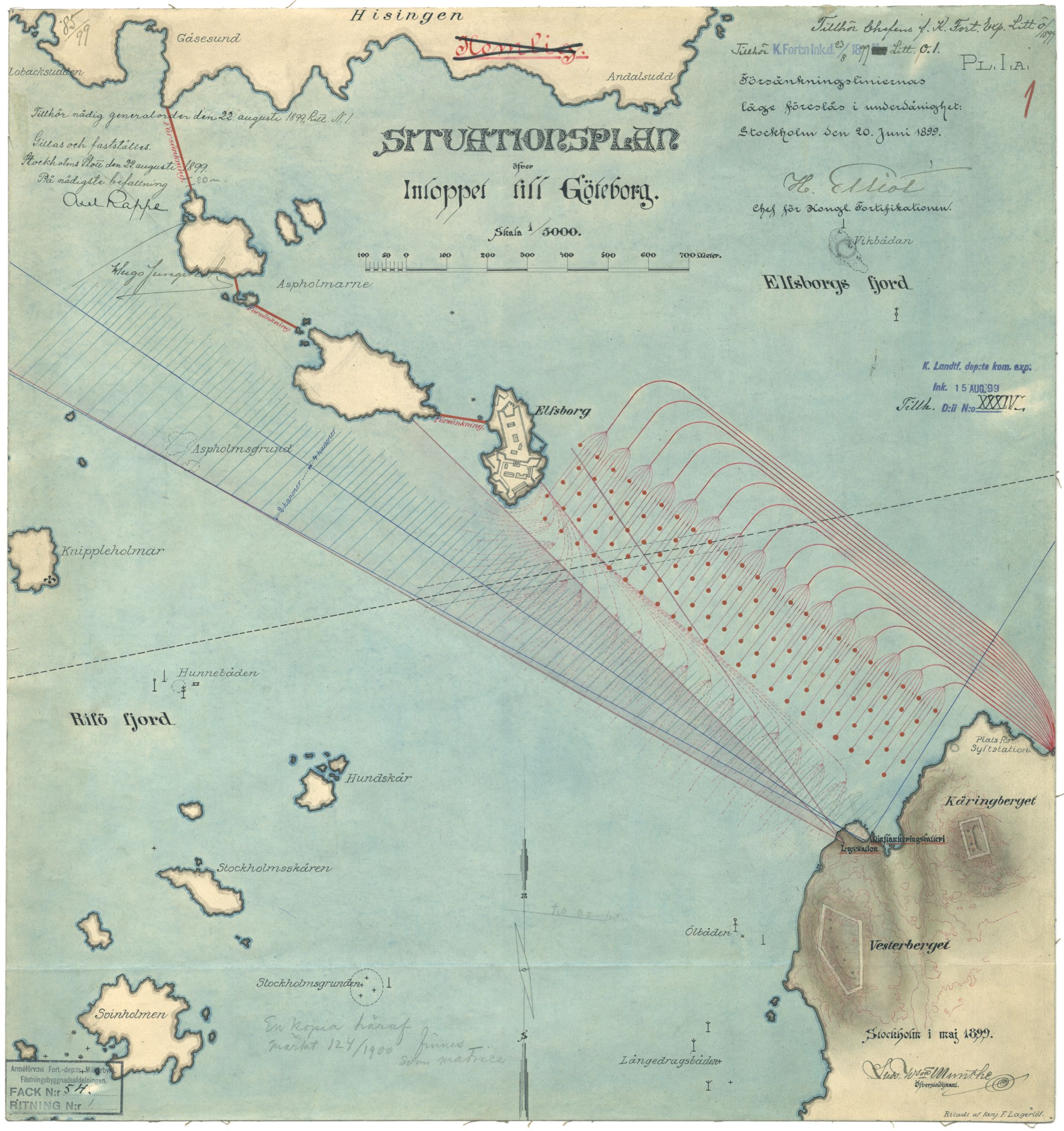
Previously classified map from 1899 of planned defence facilities in Gothenburg harbor inlet.

Staffing:

- 1902: one officer, three non-commissioned officers and 28 men
- 1912–1914: eight officers, 19 non-commissioned officers and 123 men
- 1915–1919: nine officers, 19 non-commissioned officers and 123 men
- 1912–1925 ten officers, 41, non-commissioned officers and 103 men
- 1926–1940: one officer, four non-commissioned officers and 9 men, as well as
- 1940–1942: a gradual increase in personnel

== Commandants ==
Commandants:

- 1908–1914: Sam Bolling
- 1914–1924: Arthur Edström
- 1924–1925: Hans Malmberg
- 1925–1927: Karl Norén
- 1927–1930: Gustaf Peterson
- 1930–1936: Folke Eriksson
- 1936–1939: Sigge Hultkrantz
- 1939–1941: Åke Wockatz
- 1941–1942: Rudolf Kolmodin

== Guns ==
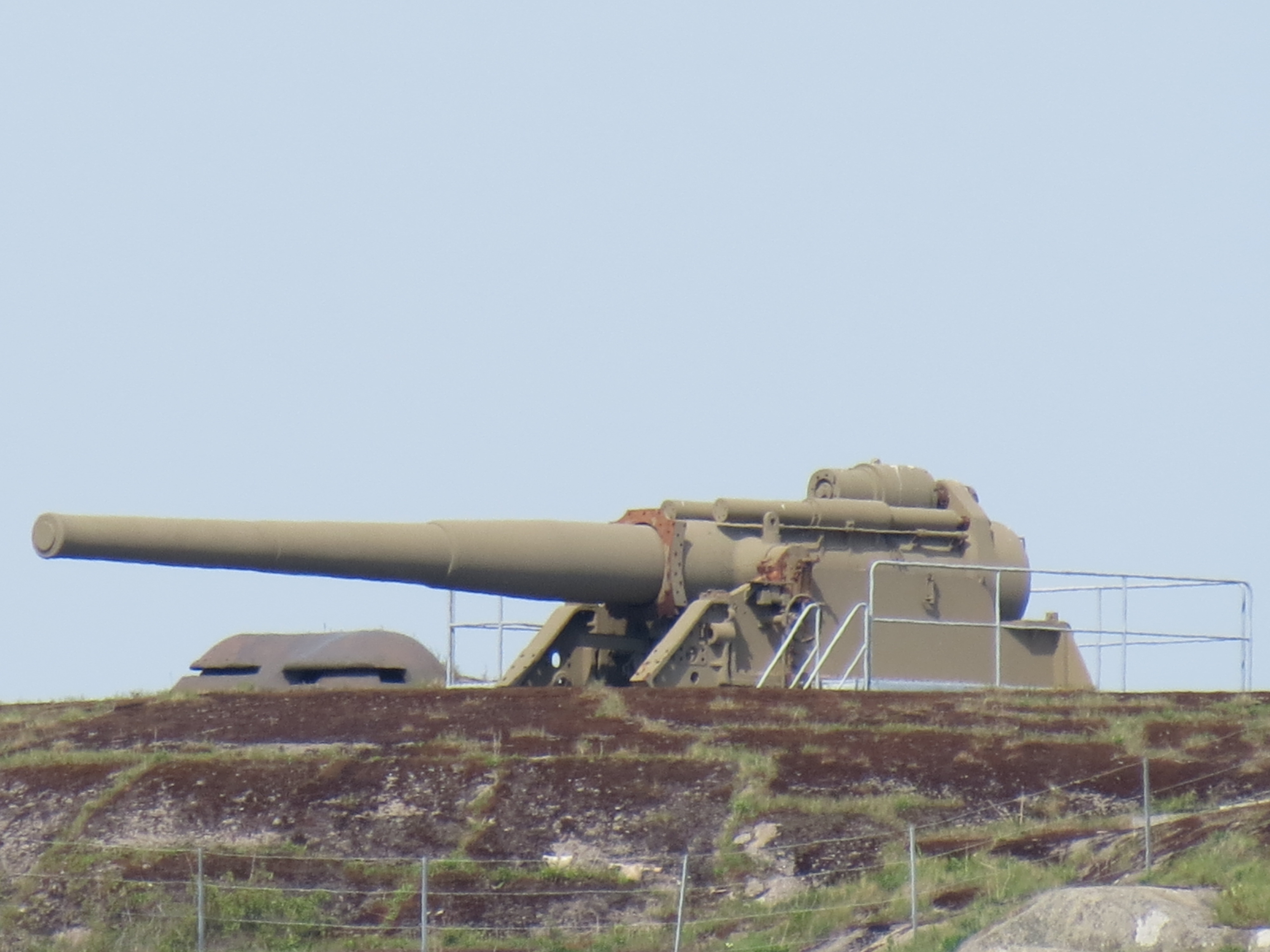
24 cm gun M/04, one of two of this type.

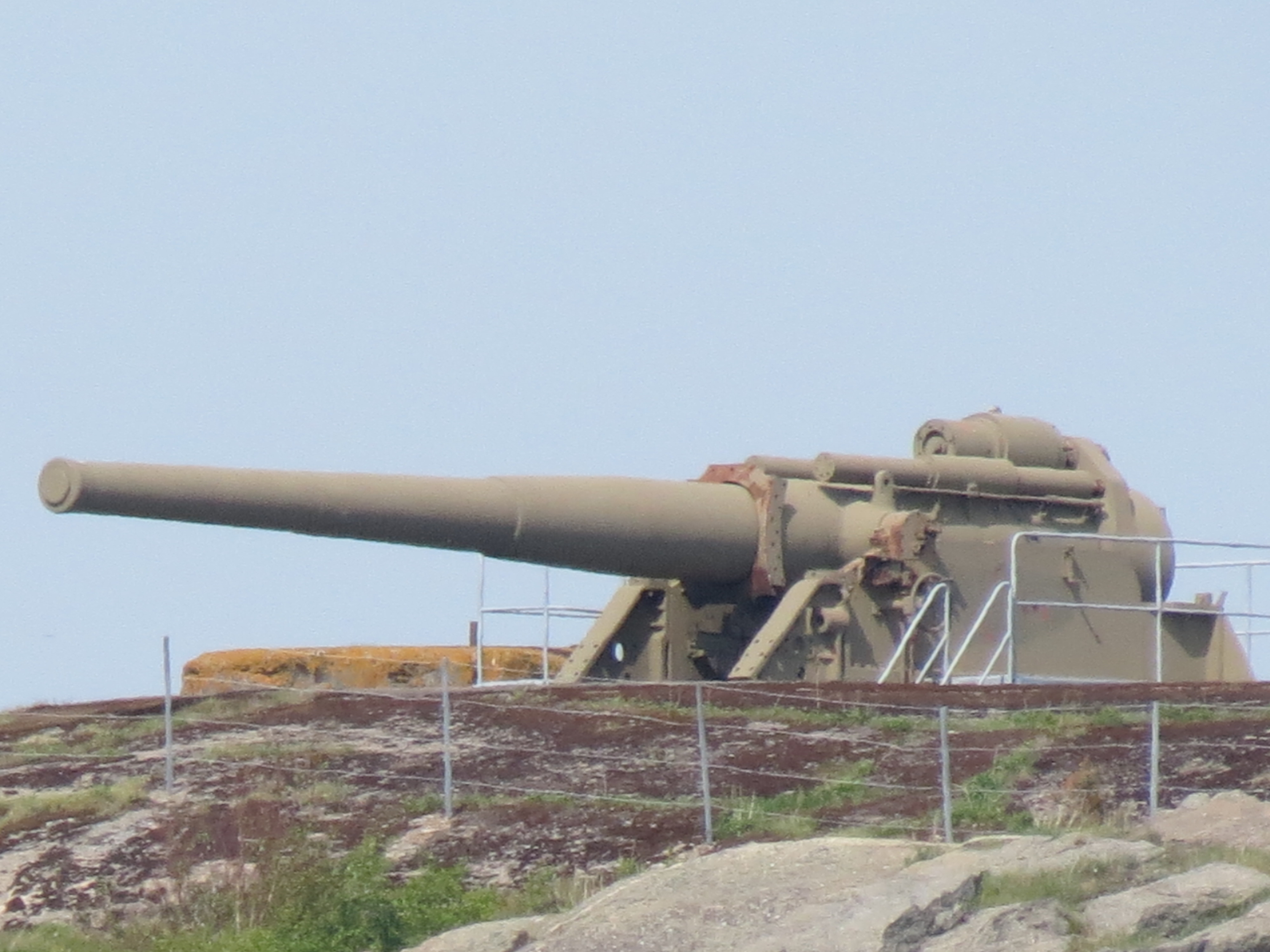
24 cm gun M/04, one of two of this type.

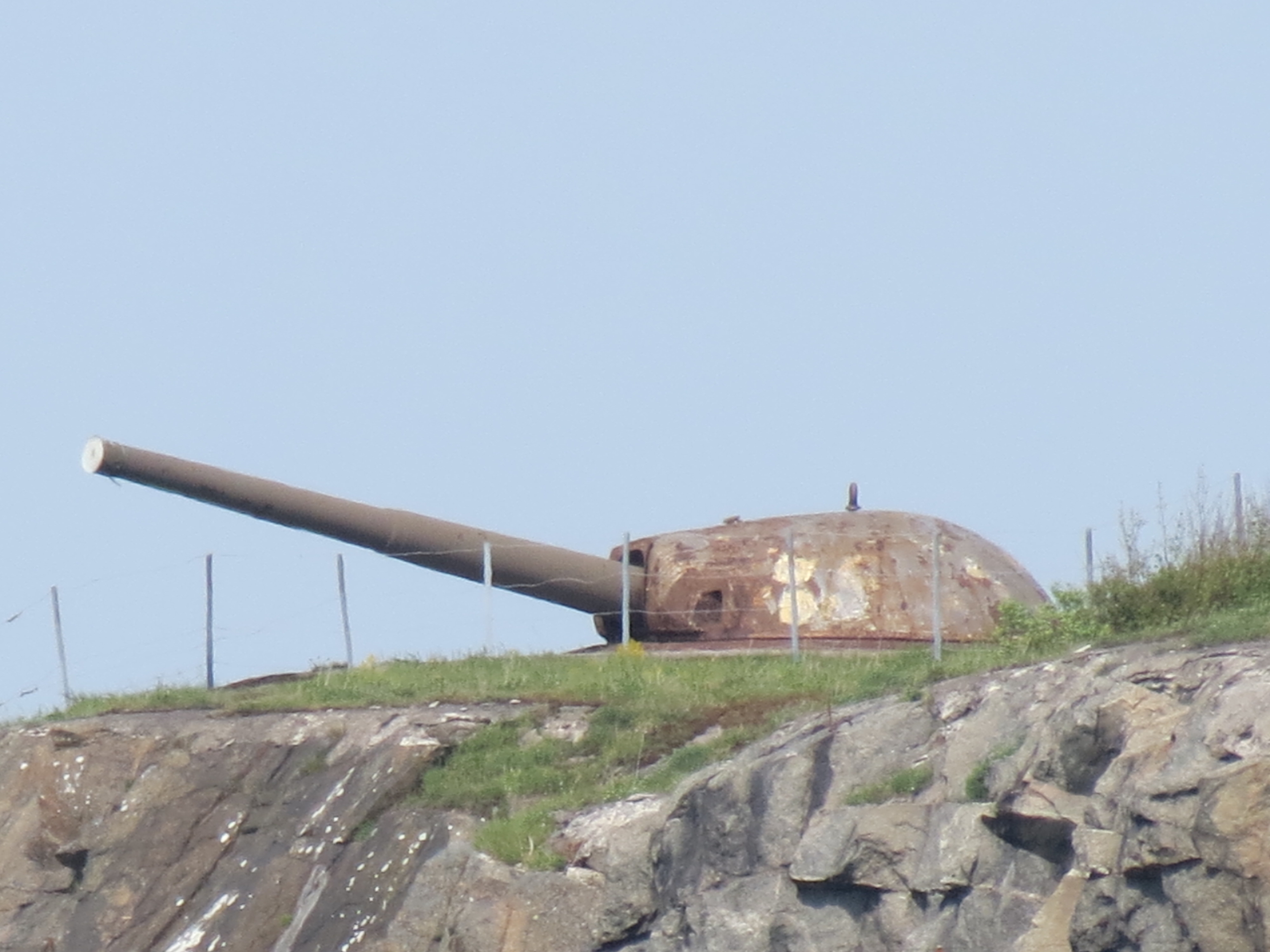
15 cm gun, one of two of this type of coastal artillery gun.

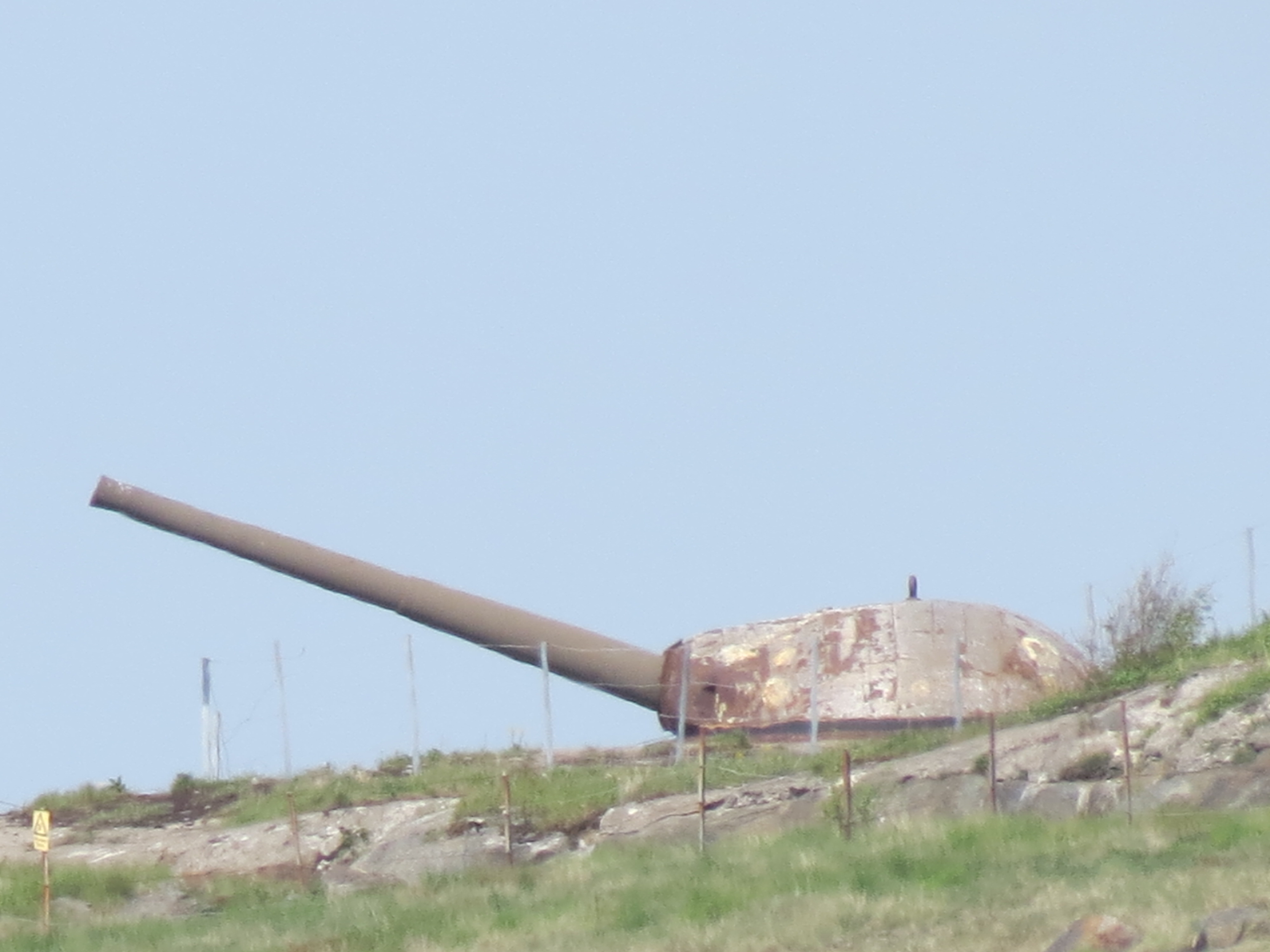
15 cm gun, one of two of this type of coastal artillery gun.
