= Timeline of Danish history =

This is a page about the chronological history of Denmark, starting with the Stone Age and ending with present Denmark.

== Stone Age-iron age ==
| Event | Date | Result |
|---|---|---|
| Stone Age | 12,000 bc | starting of the Stone Age |
| Yamnaya culture migration to Denmark | 5,000 bc | first people of Denmark died out |

== Viking age-Middle ages ==
| Event | Date | Result |
|---|---|---|
| Founding of Ribe | 705 | Ribe becomes a trading center |
| Battle of Brávellir | 770 | Death of Harald Wartooth |
| Gudfred's Invasion of the Obodrites | 808 | Seaborne invasion was successful |
| Gudfred's Invasion of Frisia | 810 | Death of Gudfred |
| Treaty of Heiligen | 811 | Danish border confirmed at the Eider |
| Great Heathen Army invasion of England | 865 | Establishment of the Danelaw |
| Siege of Paris (885–886) | 885 | Paris defended from the Vikings |
| Gorm the old's conquest of Denmark | 936 | Gorm becomes king of most of Denmark |
| Christianization of Denmark | 960s | Denmark officially converted to Christianity |
| German–Danish war of 974 | 974 | Hedeby under German occupation from 974 to 981 |
| Battle of Svolder | 1000 | Division of Norway |
| Cnut's invasion of England | 1016 | England subjugated by Denmark |
| Battle of Helgeå | 1026 | Unclear results |
| Death of Cnut the great | 1035 | Fraction of the North Sea Empire |
| peasant rebellion in Vendsyssel | 1086 | Death of Canute IV |
| Danish Civil Wars | 1131–1134; 1139–1143; 1146–1157 | Valdemar I of Denmark becomes King of Denmark |
| Wendish Crusade | 1147 | Crusader victory |
| Founding of Copenhagen | 1167 | Copenhagen founded by Absalon |
| Battle of Dösjebro | 1181 | Royal victory |
| Battle of Stellau | 1201 | Holstein Subjugated |
| Battle of Lyndanisse | 1215 | Flag of Denmark reportedly fell down |
| Expedition to Frisia | 1252 | Death of Abel |
| Murder of Erik V | 1286 | Death of Erik |
| Rebellion against Christopher II of Denmark | 1326 | Christopher II of Denmark deposed |
| Reunification of Denmark | 1340-1360 | Valdemar IV buys Denmark |
| Danish-Hanseatic War (1361-1370) | 1361-1370 | Hanseatic League gains control over several forts in Scania |
| Treaty of Kalmar | 1397 | Establishment of the Kalmar Union |
| Dano-Hanseatic War (1426–1435) | 1426-1435 | Henseatic Victory |
| Coup d'état against Erik of Pomerania | 1439-1440 | Christopher of Bavaria succeeds the danish throne |
| Treaty of Ribe | 1460 | Schleswig and Holstein should remain Forever Undivided |

== 1500-1814 ==
| Event | Date | Result |
|---|---|---|
| Battle of Hemmingstedt | 1500 | failure to subdue Dithmarschen |
| War of Deposition against King Hans | 1501-1504 | John, King of Denmark deposited as king of Sweden |
| Knut Alvsson Leads a rebellion | 1501-1504 | failure of the rebellion |
| Dano-Swedish War (1501–1512) | 1501-1512 | Treaty of Malmö (1512) |
| Establishment of the Dano-Norwegian navy | 1510 | establishment of the Dano-Norwegian navy |
| Christian II becomes king | 1513 | Christian II becomes king of Denmark and Norway |
| Dano-Swedish War (1512–1520): Battle of Brännkyrka; Battle of Bogesund; Siege of Stockholm (1520) | 1512-1520 | Sweden reincorporated into the Kalmar Union |
| Siege of Copenhagen (1523) | 1523 | Christian II Deposed |
| Revolts for the reinstalment of Christian II | 1524 | Frederik I retains the throne |
| Christian II's Invasion of Norway | 1532 | Christian II captured |
| Outbreak of Count's Feud | 1534 | Start of a religious civil war in Denmark |
| Invasion of Norway | 1537 | Norway incorporated into Denmark |
| Northern Seven Years' War: Battle of Bornholm (1563); Battle of Öland (1563); Battle of Mared (1563); First battle of Öland (1564); Action of 14 August (1563); Battle of Rügen (1565); Action of 4 June (1565); Action of 7 July (1565); Battle of Axtorna (1565); Battle of Brobacka (1566); Action of 26 July (1566); Siege of Varberg (1569) | 1563-1570 | War between Denmark-Norway and Sweden start |
| Treaty of Stettin | 1570 | Denmark became the supreme and dominating power in Northern Europe, yet failed to restore the Kalmar Union. |
| Discovery of SN 1572 | 1572 | Danish astronomer Tycho Brahe discovers SN 1572 |
| Founding of Kristianopel | 1603 | Founding of Kristianopel |
| Christian IV's expeditions to Greenland: First expedition (1605); Second expedition (1606); Third expedition (1607) | 1605-1607 | Mostly unsuccessful expeditions to Greenland |
| Jens Munk expedition to the Barents Sea | 1609 | Failure to find the Northeast Passage |
| Kalmar War: Siege of Kalmar (1611); Storming of Kristianopel (1611); Battle of Vittsjö (1612); Battle of Kringen (1612) | 1611-1613 | Denmark remains the dominant Nordic power |
| Ove Gjedde expedition: Action of 19 February 1619; Establishment of Tharangambadi (1620); Conquest of Koneswaram Temple (1622) | 1618-1622 | creation of Danish India, but failure to monopolize Sri Lanka |
| Jens Munk expedition to the Northwest Passage | 1619 | Jens Munk lands at Hudson Bay, but most of his crew dies on the expedition |
| Thirty Years' War: Battle of Dessau Bridge (1626); Battle of Lutter (1626); Siege of Stralsund (1628); Battle of Wolgast (1628) | 1625-1630 | Treaty of Lübeck |
| Torstenson War: Battle of Kolding (1644); Battle of Colberger Heide (1644); Battle of Fehmarn (1644); Battle of Bysjön (1644); Action of 16 May 1644 (1645) | 1643-1645 | Second Treaty of Brömsebro (1645) |
| Dano-Swedish War (1657–1658): March Across the Belts (1657); Battle of Møn (1657); Siege of Kolding (1658); Capture of Carolusborg (1658) | 1657-1658 | Treaty of Roskilde |
| Dano-Swedish War (1658–1660): Siege of Copenhagen (1658); Assault on Copenhagen (1659); Battle of Rödsund (1659); Battle of Ebeltoft (1659); Battle of the Sound (1659); Battle of Nyborg (1659); Bornholm Revolt (1660) | 1658-1660 | Treaty of Copenhagen (1660) |
| Lex Regia | 1664-1665 | Frederik III becomes an Absolute monarch |
| Dano-Dutch War | 1661-1665 | Danish presence preserved at the Gold Coast |
| Scanian War: Battle of Lund (1676); Bremen-Verden campaign (1676); Battle of Halmstad (1676); Invasion of Gotland (1676); Battle of Bornholm (1676); Battle of Öland (1676); Jämtland campaign (1677); Battle of Landskrona (1677); Siege of Malmö (1677); Battle of Marstrand (1677); Battle of Uddevalla (1677); Battle of Møn (1677); Battle of Køge Bay (1677); Siege of Bohus fortress (1678); Invasion of Rügen (1678) | 1675-1679 | Peace of Lund |
| Danish Code | 1683 | Danish law code reformed |
| Gregorian calendar introduced in Denmark | 1700 | Introduction of the Gregorian calendar |
| Great Northern War: Siege of Tönning (1700); Battle of Reinbek (1700); Landing at Humlebæk (1700); Bombardment of Copenhagen (1700); Battle of Køge Bay (1710); Battle of Wismar (1711); Siege of Stralsund (1711–1715); Siege of Stade (Note: Belagerung von Stade (1712)) (1712); Battle of Gadebusch (1712); Battle of Fehmarn (1715); Battle of Rügen (1715); Battle of Stresow (1715); Battle of Høland (1716); Battle of Dynekilen (1716); Battle of Gothenburg (1717); Siege of Fredriksten (1718); Attack on Marstrand (1719) | 1700, 1709-1721 | Treaty of Frederiksborg |
| Abolition of Vornedskab | 1702 | Vornedskab abolished |
| Tranquebar Mission | 1706 | First Bible translations into Tamil |
| Danish Auxiliary Corps in Habsburg service 1701–1709; Danish Auxiliary Corps in Anglo-Dutch service 1701–1714 | 1701-1714 | Danish troops send to the War of the Spanish Succession |
| Hans Egede Expedition | 1721 | Kangeq converted to Christianity |
| Copenhagen Fire of 1728 | 1728 | 28% of Copenhagen burned |
| Stavnsbånd introduced | 1733 | Introduction of Stavnsbånd |
| 1733 slave insurrection on St. John | 1733-1734 | Rebellion quelled |
| Battle of Jakobshavn | 1739 | Danish consolidation of Greenland |
| Treaty of San Ildefonso | 1742 | The treaty was never made effective |
| Cattle War | 1756 | Status quo ante bellum |
| Strilekrigen | 1765 | Rebellion quelled |
| Danish–Algerian War | 1769-1772 | Algerian victory |
| Johann Friedrich Struensee rise to power | 1770 | Johann Friedrich Struensee becomes de facto leader of Denmark |
| Danish Royal Life Guards' Mutiny | 1771 | Execution of Johann Friedrich Struensee in 1772 |
| Sagbadre War | 1784 | Anlo loses all territory it had previously acquired from its neighbors |
| Lofthusreisingen | 1786-1787 | Rebellion quelled |
| Abolition of Stavnsbånd | 1788 | Stavnsbånd abolished |
| Theatre War: Battle of Kvistrum | 1788-1789 | Status quo ante bellum |
| Battle of Tripoli | 1797 | Danish victory |
| Lærdal farmers' rebellion | 1800-1802 | Rebellion quelled |
| English Wars (Scandinavia)/ Gunboat War: Battle of West Kay (1801); Battle of Copenhagen (1801) (1801); Battle of Lübeck (1806); Battle of Copenhagen (1807); Battle of Køge (1807); Battle of Alvøen (1808); Battle of Saltholm (1808); Action of 2 March 1808 (1808); Battle of Zealand Point (1808); Battle of Silda (1810); Battle of Anholt (1811); Battle of Grimstad Bay (1811); Battle of Lyngør (1812) | 1801, 1807–1814 | Norway ceded to the King of Sweden; Heligoland ceded to United Kingdom; Swedish Pomerania ceded to Denmark |
| Outlawing of Atlantic slave trade | 1803 | Atlantic slave trade outlawed |
| Evacuation of La Romana's division | 1808 | Anglo-Spanish evacuation |
| Dano-Swedish War of 1808–1809: Battle of Lier (1808); Battle of Toverud (1808); Battle of Rødenes (1808); Battle of Trangen (1808); Battle of Furuholm (1808); Battle of Mobekk (1808); Battle of Prestebakke (1808); Battle of Berby (1808); Jämtland Campaigns of 1808–1809 | 1808-1809 | Treaty of Jönköping |
| Huéscar-Danish War | 1808 | Peace treaty |
| Jørgen Jørgensen's Revolution | 1809 | Danish government restored |
| War of the Sixth Coalition: Battle of Bornhöved (1813); Battle of Sehested (1813) | 1813-1814 | Treaty of Kiel |
| Antisemitic riots | 1813 | Jews gets equal rights under the law |

== 1814-1945 ==
| Event | Date | Result |
|---|---|---|
| Hep-Hep riots | 1819-1820 | Leaders of the Antisemites arrested |
| Capture of the sloop Anne | 1825 | Anne (El Mosquito) is disabled; pirates flee ashore |
| Katamanso War | 1826 | Anglo-Danish-Dutch Victory |
| 1848 Saint Croix slave rebellion | 1848 | Emancipation of the Saint Croix slaves |
| March Revolution | 1848 | Constitution of Denmark |
| First Schleswig War: Battle of Bov (1848); Battle of Dybbøl (1848); Battle of Mysunde (1848); Battle of Nybøl; Skirmish of Oversø (1848); Battle of Schleswig (1848); Battle of Heligoland (1849); Skirmish of Århus (1849); Battle of Eckernförde (1849); Battle of Fredericia (1849); Battle of Heligoland (1849); Battle of Isted (1850); Battle of Lottorf (1850) | 1848-1852 | Denmark retains Schleswig |
| Second Schleswig War: Battle of Als; Evacuation of Danevirke; Battle of Dybbøl; Evacuation of Fredericia; Battle for Königshügel; Battle of Lundby; Battle of Mysunde (1864); Battle of Sankelmark; Battle of Vejle; Battle of Heligoland (1864); Battle of Jasmund (1864) | 1864 | Treaty of Vienna (1864) |
| 1878 St. Croix labor riot | 1878 | Rebellion ended |
| Easter Crisis | 1920 | The king's role reduced to a symbolic head of state. |
| Schleswig unification | 1920 | South Jutland reincorporated into Denmark |
| Dano-Norwegian border dispute | 1931-1933 | Disputed territory awarded to Denmark |
| Occupation of Denmark | 1940-1945 | Denmark occupied after Operation Weserübung |

== 1945-present ==
| Event | Date | Result |
|---|---|---|
| 1946 Faroese independence referendum | 1946 | Home rule established on the Faroe Islands |
| Danish accession into NATO | 1949 | Denmark becomes a member of NATO |
| Greenlandic independence | 1979 | Greenland gains more autonomy |
| Operation Bøllebank | 1994 | UN forces repulse Serb ambush |
| Abdication of Margrethe II | 2024 | Abdication of Margrethe II |
