= Otte Rud =

Danish-Norwegian admiral

Otte Knudsen Rud til Møgelkjær
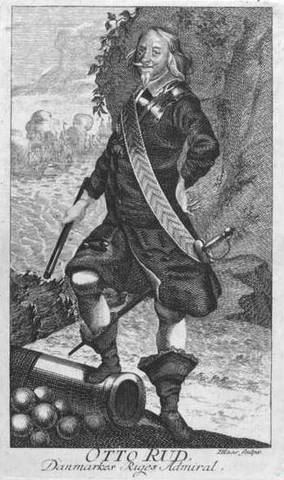
- Otte Rud was born 1520 and died 1565
- Born: 20 May 1520
- Died: 11 October 1565 (aged 45); Svartsjö castle, Sweden (POW)
- Burial place: Church of Our Lady, Copenhagen
- Spouse(s): Pernille Oxe, 1549
- Relatives: Peder Oxe, brother-in-law
- Military career
- Allegiance: Denmark-Norway
- Branch: Royal Danish Navy
- Service years: 1563-1565
- Rank: Admiral

The King of Denmark's Lensmand of Dragsholm len
- In office 1549–1551

The King of Denmark's Lensmand of Gotland
- In office 1551–1557

The King of Denmark's Lensmand of Venslev len
- In office 1554–1558

The King of Denmark's Lensmand of Odensegård len
- In office 1559–1561

The King of Denmark's Lensmand of Korsør len
- In office 1562–1574; Held by the widow after his death.

Otte Ruud (20 May 1520 – 11 October 1565) was a Danish-Norwegian admiral during the Northern Seven Years' War, who died in Swedish captivity. He spent his youth in foreign military service, and then held different fiefs from the King. Called up to duty during the war, he at first distinguished himself at land, later becoming a ship's captain, and finally admiral commanding the Danish fleet.

== Early career ==
Otte Rud was the son of the privy counsellor Knud Jørgensen Rud of Vedby and Møgelkjær. He began his education at Sorø Abbey, came to the House of Mansfeld as a page, and then served the House of Schwarzburg, becoming an esquire at 18, and fighting in the Bishop of Munster's war against the anabaptists. Rud then fought in the service of Saxony in its war against Brunswick. Back in Denmark, he became a courtier 1543, married 1549, and received his first fief the same year.

== Flag Officer ==
At the outbreak of the Northern Seven Years' War in 1563, Rud was sent to Elfsborg Castle as commissary of war under Daniel Rantzau. He distinguished himself at the battle of Mared the same year, and the King made him captain of the warship Byens Løve (56 guns). Byens Løve belonged to Herluf Trolle's fleet when it met the Swedes at the first battle of Öland in the spring of 1564. During the second day of the battle Byens Løve and the Lübeck ship Engel boarded the Swedish flagship Mars, and manage to take captive the Swedish admiral Jakob Bagge, his second-in-command, and about 100 Swedish sailors before the burning Mars exploded.

After a shorter interlude fighting with his men and horses in the land campaign in Skåne, Rud was in 1565 back at sea, as captain of the Krabat, a ship taken from the Swedes. He participated in the battle off Bukow 1565, where Herluf Trolle fell. The vice-admiral Jørgen Thygesen Brahe died of fever a few days later, and Otte Rud was subsequently appointed admiral and his brother Erik, another prominent captain, vice-admiral. In the battle of Bornholm a month later, Rud took his flagship Jægermesteren (90 guns), alongside the Swedish flagship St. Erik (90 guns), but a fire in a Swedish ship made the fleets scatter, and left Jægermesteren surrounded by enemy ships. Having lost most of his crew, the wounded Rud surrendered and was taken prisoner to Stockholm. Later taken to Svartsjö castle, he fell victim to the raging plague.

== Personal life ==
Rud was married to Pernille Johansdatter Oxe (1531-1576), daughter of the privy counsellor Johan Johansen Oxe, and sister of the privy counsellor Peder Oxe. The couple had five children: two sons, and three daughters. Rud had inherited his father's manors Vedby and Møgelkjær; he exchanged the former for Sæbygård, but kept the latter; both in allodial possession. He also held Rane's Estate as a fief. After his death, his widow retained both Rane's Estate and Korsør len as fiefs. On both the allodial manors she built new manor-houses.
