= Siege of Bohus Fortress =

Siege of Bohus Fortress may refer to:

- Siege of Bohus Fortress (1564)
- Siege of Bohus Fortress (1676)
- Siege of Bohus Fortress (1678)
