= Charlotta Frölich =

Swedish writer, historian, agronomist and poet (1698–1770)

- Born: 28 November 1698
- Died: 21 July 1770 (aged 71)
- Other name: Lotta Triven
- Occupations: Writer, historian, agronomist and poet
- Known for: First woman to be published by the Royal Swedish Academy of Sciences
- Spouse: Johan Funck
- Parent(s): Carl Gustaf Frölich and Beata Christina Cronström

Charlotta Frölich (28 November 1698 – 21 July 1770) was a Swedish writer, historian, agronomist and poet. She sometimes used the pseudonym Lotta Triven. She published poems, stories, and work about political and scientific subjects. She was the first female to be published by the Royal Swedish Academy of Sciences.

== Biography ==
Charlotta Frölich was the daughter of the Royal Councillor General Count Carl Gustaf Frölich and Beata Christina Cronström, and the paternal niece of the religious visionary and author Eva Margareta Frölich. Frölich described her childhood as very strict, deprived of any luxury and devoted to Lutheranism and hard work, and stated that she was educated in history, reading, writing, household tasks and religion.

In 1735, she married count Johan Funck, country governor of Uppland; they had four children who all died young. She had resisted marrying for many years because she wished to devote herself to agriculture, but she continued to do so after marriage in 1735; both before and after her marriage, she was the owner of the estate Överbo, which had a blast furnace where she made pig iron.

In 1741-42, she became the first woman to be published by the Royal Swedish Academy of Sciences. She published three books in agricultural science depicting her own experiences and suggesting various inventions in agriculture. The only other female to be published by the Academy of Sciences during the Age of Liberty was Eva Ekeblad. In 1759, she published a history book, making her the first female historian of her country. In 1768, she became one of two Swedish women, alongside Françoise Marguerite Janiçon, to participate in the political debate on economic policies of the state who published herself without a pseudonym during the Age of Liberty. She was also a poet known for her funeral poems.

== Works ==
Her publications included;

- Et ankommit bref om såningsmachinen under namn af Lotta Triven. (1741), book about agricultural science
- Huru Norrlands bråkorn bör skötas i södre orterne i Swerige, beskrifwit af Lotta Triwen. (1742), book about agricultural science
- I föregående ämne eller om ängeskötsel är ingifwit af Lotta Triwn. (1742), book about agricultural science
- Swea och Götha christna konungars sagor, sammanfattade til underrättelse för Sweriges almoge och menige man, som af dem kunna lära, huru deras k. fädernesland ifrån flera hundrade år tilbakars blifwit regerat, samt se, huru på gudsfruktan,: laglydnad, dygd och enighet altid följt Guds wälsignelse; men deremot synd, lagens och eders öfwerträdelse, samt oenighet, haft til påföljder swåra landsplågor, blodsutgiutelser, förödelser m.m. (1759), history book
- Charlotta Frölichs Enslighets nöje, eller Gudeliga tanckar under en andäktig bibel-läsning yttrade i rim i anledning af åtskilliga anderika språk, som til enskylt ro och förnöjelse samt lefwernes förbättring blifwit anförde och korteligen: förklarade. Tryckt i Upsala 1763 (1763), spiritual prayer book
- Den utflugne bi-swärmen, eller Högwälborna fru grefwinnan - N.N:s. berättelse til herr - N.N. Om en af honom gifwen, men år 1768 förolyckad bi- stock eller bi-kupa. Jämte herr - N.N:s swar på samma berättelse Stockholm, tryckt hos Lorens Ludvig Grefing 1768 (1768), political book
- Poëme, till allmänheten, om folck-ökningen i Swerige (1768), political book

== Sources ==
- Ann Öhrberg (2001). Vittra fruntimmer. Författarroll och retorik hos frihetstidens kvinnliga författare. Stockholm: Gidlunds Förlag. ISBN 91-7844-330-X
- Svenska adelns ättar-taflor / Afdelning 1. Abrahamsson - Granfelt
- Riksdag, kaffehus och predikstol: frihetstidens politiska kultur, 1766-1772. Skrifter utgivna av Svenska litteratursällskapet i Finland. Marie-Christine Skuncke, Henrika Tandefelt (eds.). Stockholm : Helsingfors: Atlantis; Svenska litteratursällskapet i Finland. 2003. ISBN 9174867717. ISSN 0039-6842.
