= Margareta i Kumla =

17th century Swedish visionary

Margareta i Kumla ('Margareta of Kumla') also known as the Sibyl of Kumla ('Prophetess of Kumla'), or Kumlapigan ('Maid of Kumla'), (died after 1628), was a Swedish visionary, who claimed to be possessed. She became the target of pilgrimages when claiming to be the channel of the words of the angels.

== Life ==
Margareta was born to Johannes Laurentii, the Vicar of Kumla since 1619. In 1626, Margareta, by then in her teens, claimed to have a vision of a white bird and "black" man (likely referring to the Devil). The black man tried to convince her to abandon her beliefs. At the same time, the vicarage and the church of Kumla experienced the phenomena of poltergeist.

On 30 October 1626 Margareta uttered blasphemy and called upon Satan. Afterward, she claimed to have had a visit from seven high ranked devils. On 22 October she claimed to have been visited by three angels with burning candles, among them the Archangel Michael. After this, she was unconscious for 24 hours. When she awakened, she claimed that angels and devils had fought for her soul and that she had seen the "Glory of the Lord". Between 9 December 1626 and 3 January 1627, she claimed to have been visited by a litany of angels. She stated that she had now become the channel of the angels, and that what she henceforth said was their words through her. Margareta now foretold that the war would be discontinued by a miracle in Poland. She had visions about the Sun and the stars. She also issued instructions about clothing: she condemned the use of farthingales, Ruff (clothing) for vicars, a number of different colors, and promoted white starch before blue by referring to the views of God: in the question of starch, for example, she explained that blue starch was the vomit of Satan, while white was pleasing to the Lord.

The visions of Margareta made her famous nationwide. She was called the prophetess of Kumla, and attracted pilgrimages from the entire country to the vicarage of Kumla, among them also clergy. In the vicarage, the pilgrims allegedly witnessed blankets burning with fire and could hear shouts and choirs from heaven, all affected by the poltergeist and visions of Margareta. One noted incident was when Margareta allegedly performed a miracle when she reportedly cured a boy from deafness, claiming that it was the angel Gabriel who cured the boy through her. Finally, Margareta stated that the angels had promised to dictate a letter through her, which was to be delivered to the King by her father.

On this point, Bishop Laurentius Paulinus Gothus was given the task to make an investigation. The main object of Margareta's activities from the authorities was not her revelations or her messages, as the subjects of her preaching was actually uncontroversial and in effect acceptable to the church: the problem was that she preached at all, because of her gender. On 10 February 1628, king Gustavus Adolphus of Sweden ordered that her "Foolishness and insanity" was to be stopped: all pilgrimages to her was to be discontinued by threat of imprisonment and Margareta herself were to be imprisoned if she did not discontinue her speeches. This order ended the affair: the pilgrimages to Kumla stopped, and Margareta apparently did no longer preach. Nothing more is heard of how the affair ended. However, in 1629, her father formally reported to the Bishop that the Devil had tormented his parish as well as his own daughter, and on a church meeting in 1630, the case of Margareta i Kumla is described as a case of demonic possession. It is therefore likely that the church performed an exorcism upon her.

== Aftermath ==
The visions of Margareta i Kumla were famous in Sweden in the 17th century. Her visions and alleged encounters with demons and angels were described by Bishop Laurentius Paulinus Gothus at a meeting of the Swedish clergy in 1629, and published in 1642.

== See also ==
- Eva Margareta Frölich
- Helena Ekblom
- Martha Broissier
