= Eva Margareta Frölich =

Swedish mystic, prophet, visionary and Pietistic writer

Eva Margareta Frölich (c. 1650 – September 1692 in Stockholm), was a Swedish mystic, prophet, visionary and Pietistic writer.

== Biography ==
Frölich was born the daughter of colonel Hans Christoffer Frölich and Elisabet von Plessen. The location and exact date are unknown. Her brother, Carl Gustaf Frölich, was an ennobled count; she became the aunt of Charlotta Frölich.

She was married in Riga in Latvia, then a Swedish province, to Johann Henning Neumeijer, colonel in the Swedish army, whom she abandoned in 1684, when she arrived in Stockholm in Sweden in the company of the goldsmith Berendt Doerchmann and made herself known as a prophet and a preacher. She was received by King Charles XII of Sweden, where she predicted that he was to be the founder of the thousand-year kingdom of Christ and rule over all of Christianity. The same year, she was sentenced to exile and traveled to Hamburg, where she published her work about millennialism and the seven congregations in the Bible, which caused her banishment from the city. She then settled in Amsterdam, where she published many of her works and continued to be active as a prophet and a preacher, still assisted by Berendt Doerchmann.

One of her opinions was that women should be allowed to preach.

== Return ==
She returned to Stockholm in 1692, where she held speeches against the priests "almost worse than before" and tried to publish her work. She was arrested and put in jail, where she died the same year.

Her theology has been described as a mix between spiritualism, pietism, orthodoxy and the punishment ideology from the Old Testament. She was a Lutheran, but attacked the literary version of the priests.

== See also ==
- Margareta i Kumla

== Sources ==
- Nordisk familjebok
