= Klas Horn =

Finnish-born Swedish nobleman and naval admiral

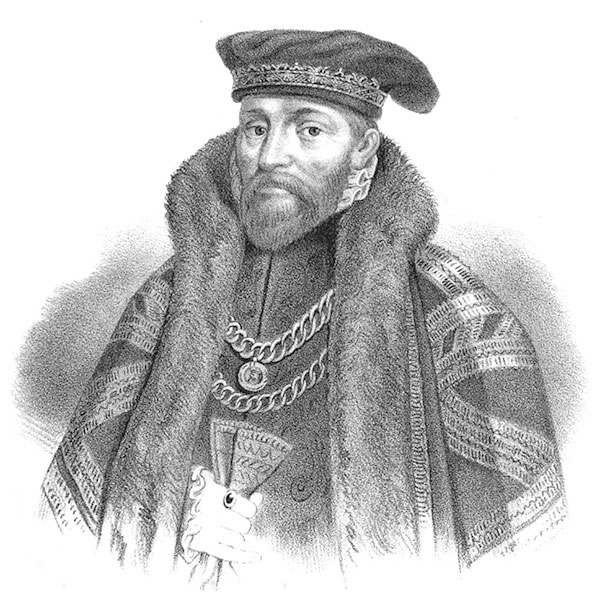
- Horn in an 1849 lithograph
- Born: 1517; Halikko, Sweden (now Finland)
- Died: 9 September 1566 (aged 48–49) Vadstena, Östergötland County
- Buried: Uppsala Cathedral
- Allegiance: Sweden
- Branch: Swedish Navy
- Rank: Admiral
- Conflicts: Russo-Swedish War (1554–1557); Expeditions of Jakob Bagge (1555); Northern Seven Years' War; Siege of Bohus Fortress (1564); Action of 14 August 1564; Battle of Rügen (1565); Action of 4 June 1565; Action of 7 July 1565; Attack on Bornholm (1566); Action of 26 July 1566

Coat of arms of the Swedish Royal Navy destroyer HSwMS Klas Horn

Baron Klas Kristersson Horn (1517 – 9 September 1566) was a Finnish-born Swedish nobleman and naval admiral who fought for Sweden in the Northern Seven Years' War of 1563–1570.

== Biography ==
Horn was born at Åminne Manor in Halikko, Finland. He was the son of Krister Klasson Horn and Ingeborg Siggesdtr Sparre. He received his early education in the court of Philip I, Duke of Pomerania. In 1550, King Gustav I of Sweden made him the head of the district of southern Finland at Raseborg.

He participated in the expeditions of Jakob Bagge during autumn 1555. In 1556, he was sent to Viborg Castle and the following year was made commander. In 1559, he won a number of battles against Danish naval forces under Herluf Trolle and the Free City of Lübeck. Horn was sent to Reval (now Tallinn) by King Eric XIV of Sweden in March 1561. By June, Toompea Castle was conquered by his troops and Reval became a dominion of Sweden.

Klas Horn was raised to nobility (Horn af Åminne) and made a baron in June 1561. In February 1564, he led an unsuccessful siege of Bohus Fortress. After Jakob Bagge was captured, Klas was promoted to admiral in the Royal Swedish Navy in autumn 1564. In January 1565, forces under his command sacked the Danish provinces of Scania and Halland. He won a decisive victory over the Danish navy at Bornholm on 7 July 1565 and on 26 July 1566 in the third battle of the northern part of Öland. He died shortly after being called to command Swedish land forces.

== Personal life ==
In 1551, he married Kerstin Krumme (1532–1611). He died at Stora Åby parish in Östergötland, Sweden and was buried at Uppsala Cathedral.

== Legacy ==
Baron Klas Kristersson Horn has been recognized as a naval hero, with both the Royal Swedish Navy and Finnish Navy naming vessels in his honor: HSwMS Klas Horn (1929) and Klas Horn (1892).

== See also ==
- Battle of Rügen (1565)
- Horn family
- Klas-class destroyer
- Finnish gunboat Klas Horn

== Works cited ==
- Lindbergh, Katarina Harrison (2022-10-26). Nordiska sjuårskriget [Northern Seven Years' War] (in Swedish). Cover by Per Idborg. Historiska Media. ISBN 9789180500951.

== Related reading ==
- Björn Wahlroos (2009) Åminne - gårdens historia och restaureringen av karaktärsbyggnaden (Helsingfors: Lönnberg) ISBN 978-952-92-5817-8
