= Finnish gunboat Klas Horn =

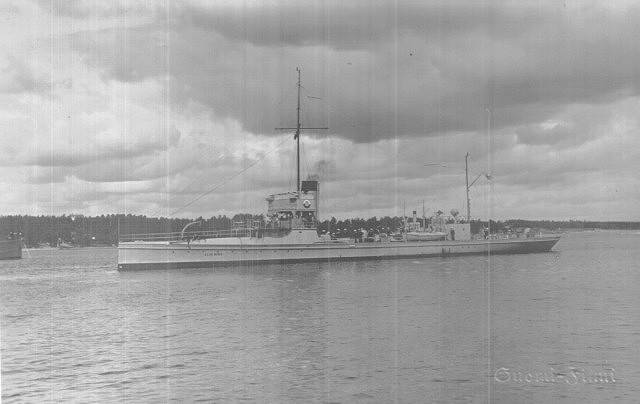

History

Russia
- Name: Posadnik
- Builder: Schichau, Elbing, Germany
- Laid down: 1891
- Launched: 13 April 1892
- Commissioned: 1892
- Decommissioned: 1918
- Fate: Taken over by Finland 1918

Finland
- Name: Klas Horn
- Namesake: Klas Horn
- Commissioned: 1918
- Decommissioned: 1937
- Fate: Broken up for scrap, 1938

General characteristics as built
- Class & type: Kazarski-class gunboat
- Displacement: 420 t (410 long tons)
- Length: 60.20 m (197 ft 6 in)
- Beam: 7.42 m (24 ft 4 in)
- Draught: 3.25 m (10 ft 8 in)
- Propulsion: 1 shaft, vertical triple expansion engine, 3,500 ihp (2,600 kW)
- Speed: 21 knots (39 km/h; 24 mph)
- Complement: 65
- Armament: 6 × 3-pounder guns; 3 × 1-pounder guns; 2 × 15 in (380 mm) torpedo tubes

Klas Horn was originally the Kazarski-class torpedo gunboat Posadnik of the Imperial Russian Navy. One of three built for the Russian Baltic Fleet, Posednik was used as a despatch vessel during World War I. During the Russian Revolution, Finland declared independence from the Russian Empire and the ship, which lay abandoned in Finnish waters, was taken over by the newly formed Finnish Navy and renamed Klas Horn, after a 16th-century admiral. Klas Horn ended her Finnish Navy service in the 1930s. The ship was broken up for scrap in 1938.

== Design and description ==
The Kazarski class were an early Russian design of torpedo gunboats. The ships measured 60.20 metres (197 ft 6 in) long with a beam of 7.42 m (24 ft 4 in) and a draught of 3.25 m (10 ft 8 in). They had a displacement of 420 tonnes (410 long tons) (Note: Budzbon has the displacement for Posadnik as 393 t (387 long tons).) and had a complement of 65 officers and ratings. They were propelled by one shaft powered by a vertical triple expansion engine fed steam by two Ioco boilers rated at 3,500 indicated horsepower (2,600 kW). The Kazarskis sported a single funnel. They had a maximum speed of 21 knots (39 km/h; 24 mph) and could carry 90 tonnes (89 long tons; 99 short tons) of coal for fuel. They were initially armed with six 3-pounder (47 mm) guns and three 1-pounder guns. The Kazarskis were also equipped with two 15-inch (380 mm) torpedo tubes. One was fixed in the bow while the other was deck-mounted and could be trained at targets.

The vessel underwent a series of modifications during her existence. In 1907 Posadnik had her 3-pounder guns replaced with two 57 mm (2.2 in)/40 calibre guns. (Note: The length of Russian guns in calibres denotes the overall length of the gun and not bore length.) In 1910 the ship was rearmed with two 75 mm (3.0 in) guns, two 57 mm guns, two machine guns and the bow torpedo tube was removed. In 1911, Posadnik underwent another change, having the bow 75 mm gun swapped out for a 4-inch (100 mm)/60 calibre gun. In 1917, the second 75 mm gun was swapped out for a 4-inch gun.

== Construction and career ==
Posadnik was constructed at the Schichau shipyard in Elbing, Germany. The vessel was laid down in 1891 and launched on 13 April 1892. During World War I, Posadnik was used as a despatch vessel for the Baltic Fleet. During the Bolshevik Revolution, Finland declared independence from the Russian Empire in 1918. The basis for the new nation's navy were a series of former Russian vessels abandoned during the revolution in Finnish waters. Posadnik was taken over in March 1918 and renamed Klas Horn for a a 16th-century admiral. The ship was stricken in 1937 and broken up for scrap in 1938.

== See also ==
- Finnish gunboat Matti Kurki
