= Attack on Bornholm (1566) =

1566 attack on Bornholm

- Part of the Northern Seven Years' War
- Nautical chart of the Baltic from Giedser Odde to Bornholm published in 1908. Bornholm is shown in the top right.
Date	10–24 June 1566
Location	Bornholm, Denmark 55°8′N 14°55′E
Result	Danish victory

Belligerents
Sweden	Denmark–Norway

Commanders and leaders
Klas Horn	Schweder Kettingk

Units involved
Unknown	Bornholm militia

Strength
60 ships; 36 warships; 24 other vessels (Note: Described as "Pinkor", "Jagter" and "Koffardi".)	Unknown

Casualties and losses
Unknown	Unknown

The attack on Bornholm occurred between 10 and 24 June 1566 during the Northern Seven Years' War when a Swedish fleet of 60 ships under the command of Klas Horn attempted to capture the island. Horn initially sent letters to negotiate but eventually began bombarding the island and later attempted to land, which failed. The Swedes withdrew on 24 June.

== Background ==
On 10 June 1566, the commander of Bornholm, Schweder Ketting, reported that he had spotted the Swedish fleet near the island to Frederick II which had set out towards the island 5 days prior. In total, the fleet consisted of 60 ships in total, with 36 being warships and the rest being lesser vessels referred to as "Pinker", "Jagter", and "Koffardiskibe".

Prior to the attack, Kettingk had created a militia to defend the island, additionally having around 400 Landsknechte.

== Attack ==
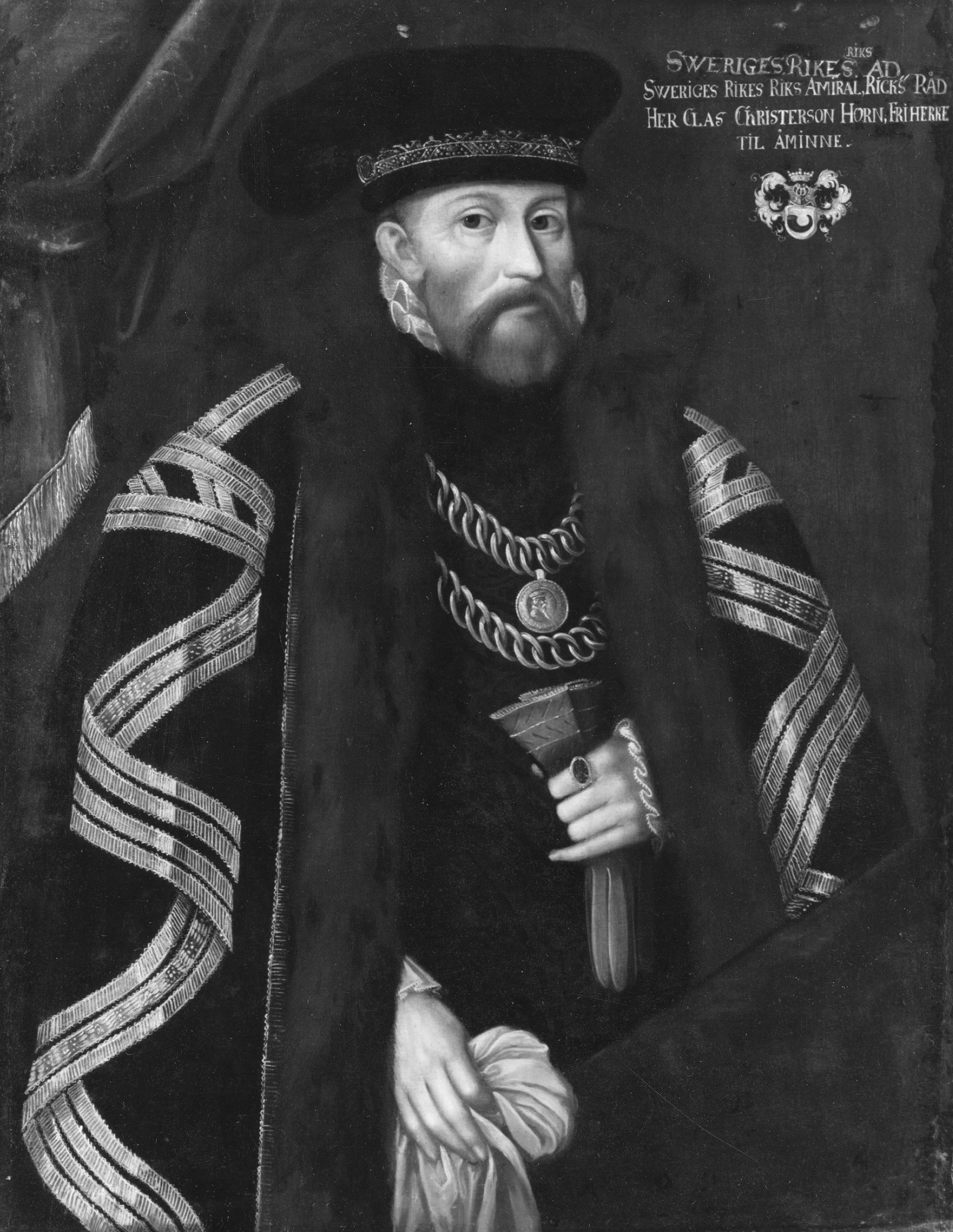
Portrait of Klas Horn by an unknown author

When Klas Horn came close to the island, he decided to attempt to capture it, not expecting much resistance. He sent an initial letter ashore, asking for some "good men" to be dispatched to his ship. When this was not done, he sent the following letter:

But since you do not comply with my will and request, then you should consider that I will by no means leave such arrogance unpunished, as I did last autumn, unless you fully expect that I will properly and most fiercely visit you with murder, pillage, and fire, and in every way oppose you as one enemy opposes another, paying no heed to what the castle warden at Hammershus instructs and forbids you. I demand a reply to this letter without any delay or hesitation.

As a response, Kettingk wrote "I owe the Swedish admiral nothing but powder and shot." The Swedes soon began bombarding Bornholm, doing so for 10 days and causing minimal damage.

Eventually, he attempted to land on the island by force, being met by resistance from armed peasants that Kettingk had organized. The Swedes were quickly surprised by the resistance, being forced to withdraw on 24 June.

== Aftermath ==
After this failure, Horn continued elsewhere. Part of the Swedish fleet entered the Sound, where they attacked merchant ships to and from Denmark.

== Works cited ==
- Lindbergh, Katarina (2022). Nordiska sjuårskriget [Nordic Seven Years' War] (in Swedish). Historiska Media. ISBN 9789180500951.
- Westling, Gustaf Oskar Fredrik (1879). Det Nordiska Sjuårskrigets historia [History of the Northern Seven Years' War] (in Swedish). Stockholm: P.A. Norstedts & Söner.
- Jørgensen, J. A [in Danish] (1900). Bornholms Historie [History of Bornholm] (PDF) (in Danish). Rønne: forlagt af Frits Sørensens Boghandel.
- Jørgensen, Knud (1906). Bornholmske samlinger [Bornholm collections] (in Danish). Rønne: Colbergs boghandels forlag.
