= Carl Gustaf Warmholtz =

Swedish writer (1713–1785)

Carl Gustaf Warmholtz (1713–1785) was a Swedish scholar, historian, writer, and a collector of historical books and manuscripts. A large bibliography of books and texts concerning Sweden is his main work still widely used and "remains the first place to look for Swedish imprints published before 1774".

He studied first at Uppsala University, then in several European universities. He served as a secretary of the governments in Ypres (Flanders) and created links with prominent scholars in the Dutch Republic, Germany and other countries. He married the Dutch-born Françoise Marguerite Janiçon, later a Swedish writer. He returned to Sweden in 1744 or 1745.

Warmholtz preferred country life, so he bought about 1747 the manor near Nyköping and called it Kristineholm.

Warmholtz, who before his homecoming translated to French Nordberg's King Carl XII's History (1742), began early and continued until his death with eagerness to collect, organize, read and review all accessible deposits and foreign printed works and manuscripts concerning Swedish political, ecclesiastical, scholarly, legal and natural history, geography and more. Following the pattern of Father Jacques Lelong's Bibliothèque historique de la France (1719), Warmholtz prepared a large bibliography of prints and manuscripts concerning Sweden printed as Bibliotheca historica sueo-gothica; eller förtekning uppå så väl trykte, som handskrifne böcker, tractater och skrifter, hvilka handla om svenska historien, eller därutinnan kunna gifva ljus; med critiska och historiska anmärkningar [Bibliography of Swedish history, a listing of manuscripts, printed books, treatises and writings on Swedish history] (15 volumes, 1782–1817, reprinted Copenhagen 1966-68), including 9,744 works of importance. Warmholtz's numbering of the books and prints is still in use in Swedish scholarly studies and on the antiquarian market, as there is still no Swedish national bibliography for the period 1700-1830. The classification scheme of Warmholtz's bibliography is still used in Swedish historical bibliography.

The first two volumes of Warmholtz's bibliography were printed in Stockholm by Gjörwells publishers 1782-1783, then some volumes were published with the support of Fredheim, and in 1796 Gjörwell sold the publishing rights to Uppsala University Library, which published the last volumes, partly with the support of Crown Prince Karl Johan (volumes 12-15). A register of all the works was published in 1889 (Uppsala) by Aksel Andersson.

Warmholtz's collection of manuscripts is preserved at the Library of Uppsala University.
