= Carl Gustaf Frölich =

Swedish count, military and civil servant

Count Carl Gustaf Frölich
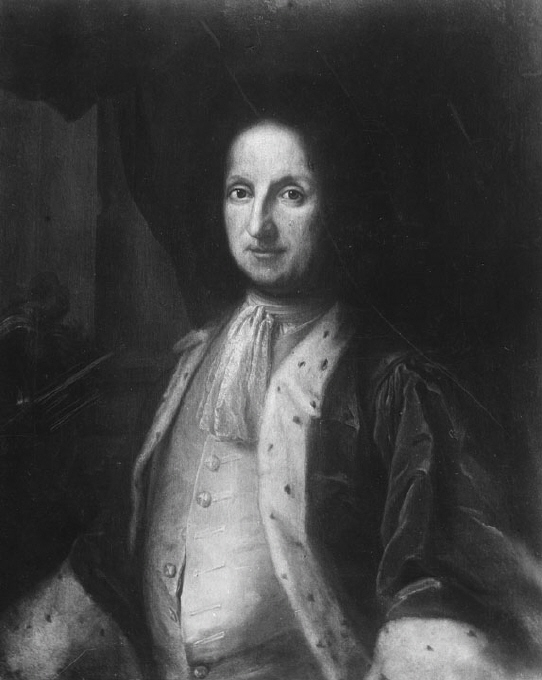
- Born: Missing required parameter 1=month! 1637; Hällestad, Sweden
- Died: 14 March 1714 (aged 76–77); Stockholm, Sweden
- Spouse(s): Plantina Margareta Bengtsdotter, dead 1690; Beata Christina Cronström (1671—1706)
- Military career
- Allegiance: Sweden
- Rank: infantry general
- Conflicts: Scanian War; Siege of Bohus fortress; Great Northern War

Count Carl Gustaf Frölich (1637 – 14 March 1714) was a Swedish military officer of German descent, Riga Governor in 1700–1706 and infantry general. He was the brother of a Pietist writer and mystic Eva Margareta Frölich (1650–1692) and a colonel Hans Frederik Frölich (1637–1715).

== Biography ==
Born in 1637 in the family of the Swedish Army officer colonel Hans Christoffer Frölich (1602-1658) and his wife Elizabeth, born in von Plessen.

Frölich became Lieutenant-Major of the Swedish Army and Commander in Bohus Fortress in 1676. In 1678 he became Lieutenant-Colonel. In the summer of 1678 Bohus fortress was besieged by Ulrik Frederik Gyldenløve and an army of 7,000 German and 9,000 Norwegian soldiers. Bohus Fortress had a Swedish crew of 900 men, led by Colonel Friedrich Börstell and Lieutenant Colonel Carl Gustav Frölich. The fortress was fired for two months with quantities of cannonballs, bombs, rock bumps, glowing bullets, grenades and mines. The attackers also used catapult to throw in bags with latrine for the purpose of spreading disease. The Swedish crew, however, managed the siege, but more than half the crew did. After the siege, Frölich became colonel and commander in Marstrand. He became a naturalized Swedish nobleman.

In 1693 he became Major-General at Västernorrland County, Jämtland and Härjedalen.

The new King of Sweden Karl XII was appointed commander of the Helsinki Regiment in 1698 and, after the commencement of the Great Northern War on 12 March 1700, was promoted to Governor of Riga and lieutenant-general.

From 18 April 1702 he also served as Governor-General of Vidzeme, Sweden, and during the invasion of Russian troops in 1704, he was promoted to infantry general and commander of the Riga garrison.

On 17 January 1706 he was dismissed as Governor General before the siege of Riga (1709-1710) due to an unsuccessful attempt of monetary reform. He left Vidzeme and returned to Sweden, where he died in 1714.

== Appointments ==
During Karl XII the appointments came at a rapid pace for Frölich, where he became

- head of Helsinki regiment in 1698
- Riga Governor 1700-1706, Lieutenant General and free lord in 1700,
- general of infantry in 1704,
- royal council and president in Dorpat's court of justice in 1705
- Count in 1706.
