= Françoise Marguerite Janiçon =

Swedish writer

Françoise Marguerite Janiçon (1711-1789) was a Swedish writer.

== Biography ==
She was born in the Netherlands as one of two daughters of the Huguenot François Michel Janiçon (1674-1730), Dutch minister in Hesse-Cassel, and Marguerite Anne Marie de Ville; from 1741, she lived in Sweden with her spouse, the Swedish historiographer Carl Gustaf Warmholtz (1713-1785) and their daughter Marianne. Her spouse was ennobled in 1752 in order to by the noble estate Christineholm.

Françoise Marguerite Janiçon belonged to the few females who participated in the political debate under their own name rather than under a pseudonym during the Swedish Age of Liberty, along with Elisabeth Stierncrona, Anna Antoinetta Gyllenborg, Hedvig Charlotta Nordenflycht, Charlotta Frölich and Anna Margareta von Bragner. She was at one point referred to by Carl Christoffer Gjörwell the Elder as the most learned female in Sweden, and upheld a political correspondence with Carl Reinhold Berch.

In 1767, she published the political work Tankar i anledning af Sista Öfwerflöds-Förordningen Och Dess wärkställighet; Fattade i pennan, och Dedicerade til MALCONTENTERNE, Af En Fri Svensk (Thoughts in regard to the last Abundance-Law and its implementation; written by pen, and dedicated to MALCONTENTERNE, by a free Swede). In it, she supported the regulations to reserve certain clothes according to class, and spoke to in particular female readers with question as to how the economy of the state should be organized.

Alongside Charlotta Frölich, she was one of two women to publicly participate in the debate as to how the economy should be governed by the state.

== Publications ==
- Tankar i anledning af Sista Öfwerflöds-Förordningen Och Dess wärkställighet; Fattade i pennan, och Dedicerade til MALCONTENTERNE, Af En Fri Svensk (1767)
