= Thomas Leopold =

Swedish Pietist martyr

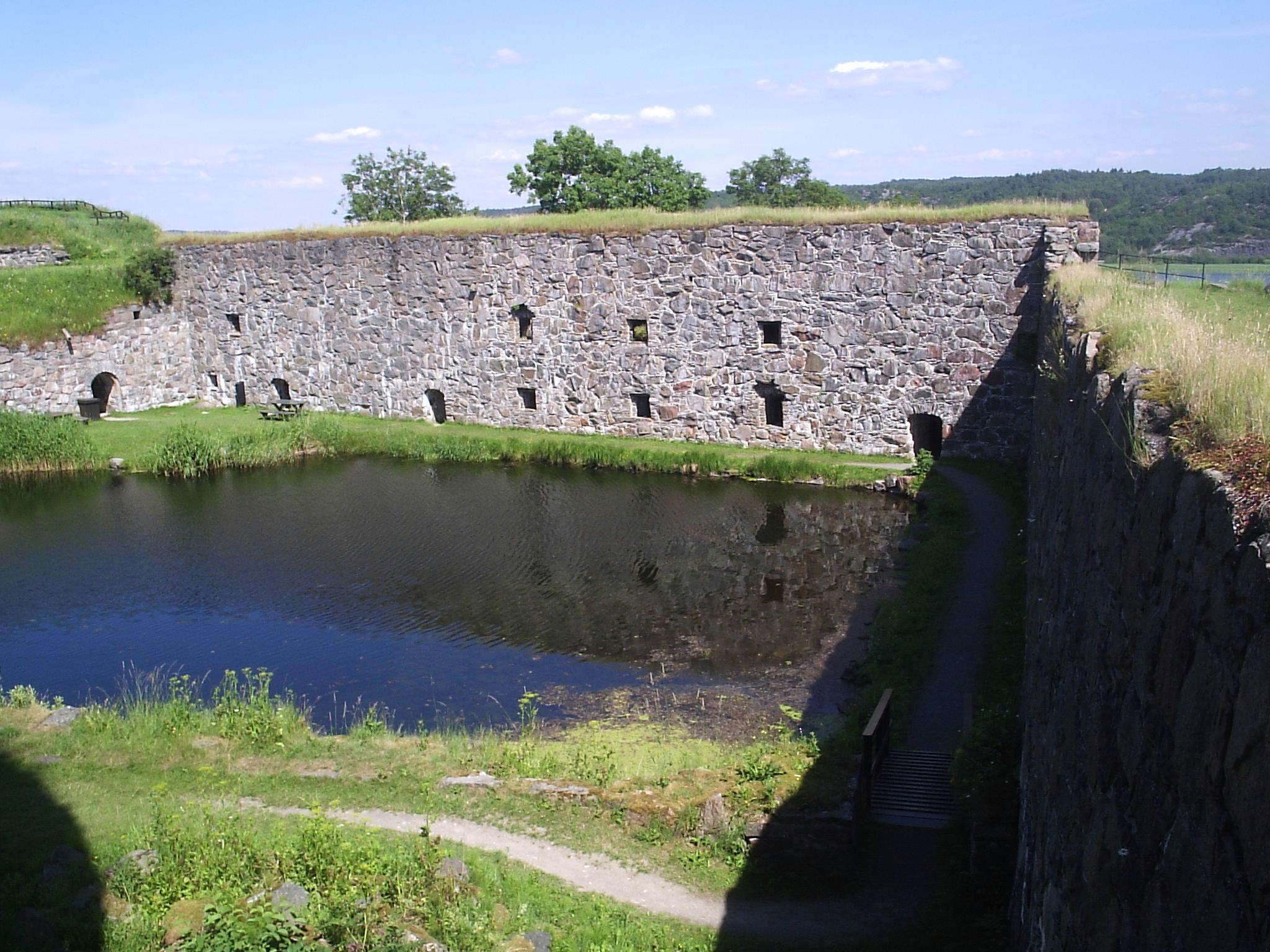
Outer court at Bohus Fortress

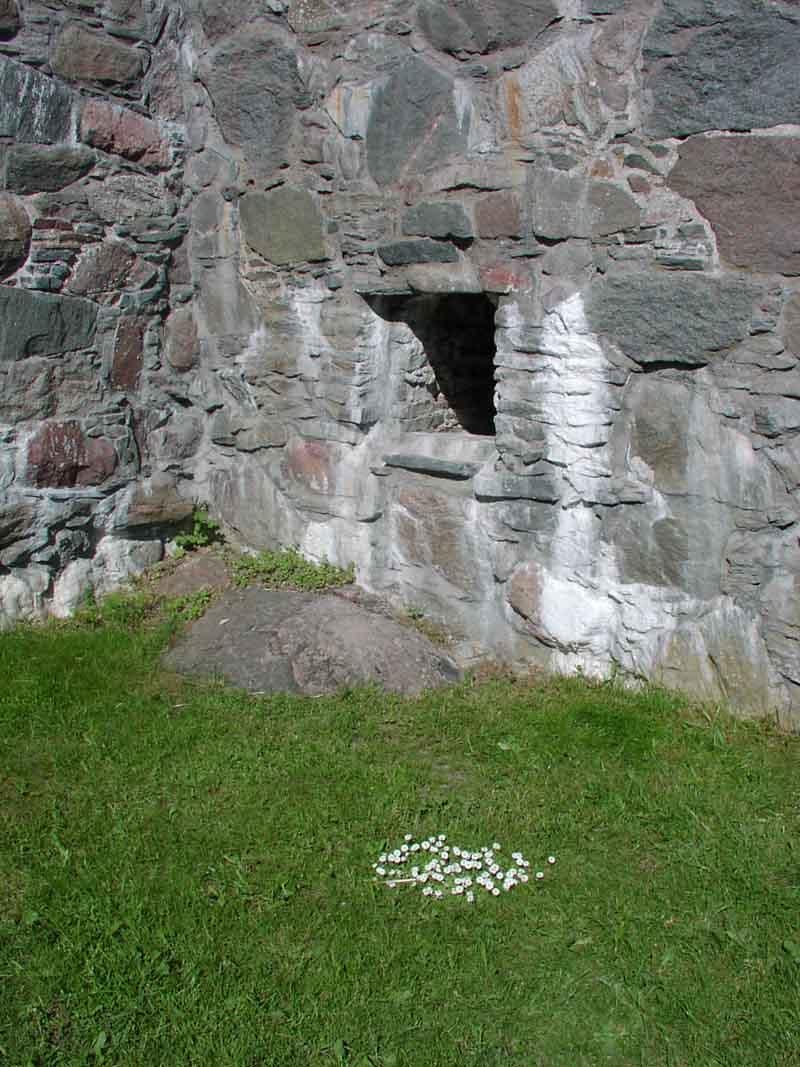
The window opening to Thomas Leopolds' cell in the corner of the outer court

Thomas Leopold (born 15 December 1693 near Kristianstad, Scania, died 21 February 1771 in Kungälv) was one of the prophets and martyrs of the Swedish Pietist movement during the 18th century. He would spend 42 years in prison for rejecting the Swedish state church.

== Biography ==
Thomas Leopold was born 15 December in Skåne. Leopold's father Sigfrid had immigrated from Germany, and his mother was the daughter of an immigrant Scotsman.

In 1728 when Leopold was 35 and studying in Lund, he was imprisoned for his radical profession of faith, rejecting the state church. He would remain a prisoner for the next 42 years. Leopold was imprisoned first at Bohus Fortress, then at Kalmar Castle. In 1741, Leopold was transferred to Danviken hospital. At Danviken, Leopold reportedly was able to develop a small congregation of followers, to the consternation of his jailers.

In 1746, Leopold was returned to Bohus Fortress where he would ultimately spend the next 25 years of his imprisonment, largely in solitary confinement. He would die there, on 21 February 1771 at age 77.

Sometimes he was visited at the castle by Lutheran priests, who told him he could be freed immediately, if only he denounced his Radical-Pietistic beliefs. He always answered calmly that he had promised Jesus to be faithful until the end.

Today, Leopold's prison cell can be visited at Bohus fortress, where an exhibition and film about his life can be viewed.

== See also ==
- Pietism
- Radical Pietism
- Johann Konrad Dippel
- Lars Ulstadius
