= Action of 26 July 1566 =

Battle in the Northern Seven Year's War

Coordinates: 56°44′N 16°40′E

- Part of Northern Seven Years' War
Date	26 July 1566
Location	East of Öland
Result	Inconclusive

Belligerents
Sweden	Denmark; Lübeck

Commanders and leaders
(Sweden) Klas Horn	(Denmark) Hans Lauritsen; Bartholomeus Tinnappel

Strength
(Sweden) 60 ships	(Denmark) 25 ships 11 ships

Casualties and losses
Significant, but unknown	(Denmark) 12 ships 3 ships 5,900 drowned

The battle that took place on 26 July 1566 during the Northern Seven Years' War and was a slight victory for a Swedish fleet over a combined Danish and Lübecker fleet. It began just east of Öland and the Allied fleet eventually retreated toward Gotland.

Two days after the battle a storm sank fourteen of the Allied ships while they were anchored near Visby, drowning around 5900 men. The Swedish fleet, further out to sea, returned to port with some damage.

On 25 July, Horn discovered the Allied Danish–Lübeck fleet at the northern tip of Öland, headed for Gotland. Horn, who had a headwind, decided to avoid battle, but when the wind turned he started the battle on the morning of 26 July. A few more losses did not affect either fleet, when a sudden wind made it impossible for the Swedish navy to continue its pursuit of the Danish fleet, which was anchored to the Gotland coast to bury the Danish vice-admiral Christopher Morgisen on hallowed ground after his death from a cannonball.

Shortly after that a sudden storm broke out. The Swedish navy, which was at sea, survived without major losses, other than having had to fell the main mast of the Hector, and was able to flee to Älvsnabben by 6 August. The Allied fleet however was thrown against the coast of Gotland, and 12 Danish and 3 Lübeck vessels were smashed, and most of the ships' crews, numbering around 5000, were drowned, with only around 1400 surviving ashore.

== Ships involved ==
* indicates ships that sank in the storm of 28 July 1566

=== Sweden ===
- St Erik 90 (flag)
- Finska Svan 82
- Hercules 81
- Böse Lejon 56
- Engel 49
- other ships

=== Denmark ===
- Samson* (flag)
- Hannibal*
- Merkurius*
- Achilles (Christopher Mogensen, died)
- Engel*
- Solen*
- Flores*
- Hoyenhald*
- Papegoye*
- Griffe*
- Engelske Fortuna*
- Hertug Olufs Pincke*
- other ships

=== Lübeck ===
- Morian* (Lübeck flagship)
- Josua* (2nd Lübeck flagship)
- Havfru*
- other ships
