= Rane's Estate =

Rane's Estate (Ranes gods) was the estate, containing most of the farms in the villages Dagstrup in Mørke Parish, and Termestrup and Hvilsager in Hvilsager Parish, once owned by Rane Jonsen, Chamberlain to King Eric V of Denmark. After his execution in 1294 as an accomplice to the murder of the King, the estate was confiscated by the Crown, and during centuries maintained as a fief called Rane's Estate, forming its own legal jurisdiction or Birk.

== Sources ==
- Lebech, Mogens (1935). "Jyllands gamle Retskredse." Jyske Samlinger, 5(2), p. 275. Retrieved 2017-01-08.
- Møller, Mogens (2016). Grenaa og omegn under fremmede herrer. Copenhagen: BoD, p. 70.
- Bricka, C.F. (1887-1905). Dansk Biografisk Lexikon. Kjøbenhavn, Gyldendalske Boghandels Forlag, vol. 8, pp. 537-538. Retrieved 2017-01-08.
