= Bohus Fortress =

Medieval fortress on the former Norwegian–Swedish border

Coordinates: 57°51′42″N 11°59′58″E

- Kungälv, Sweden
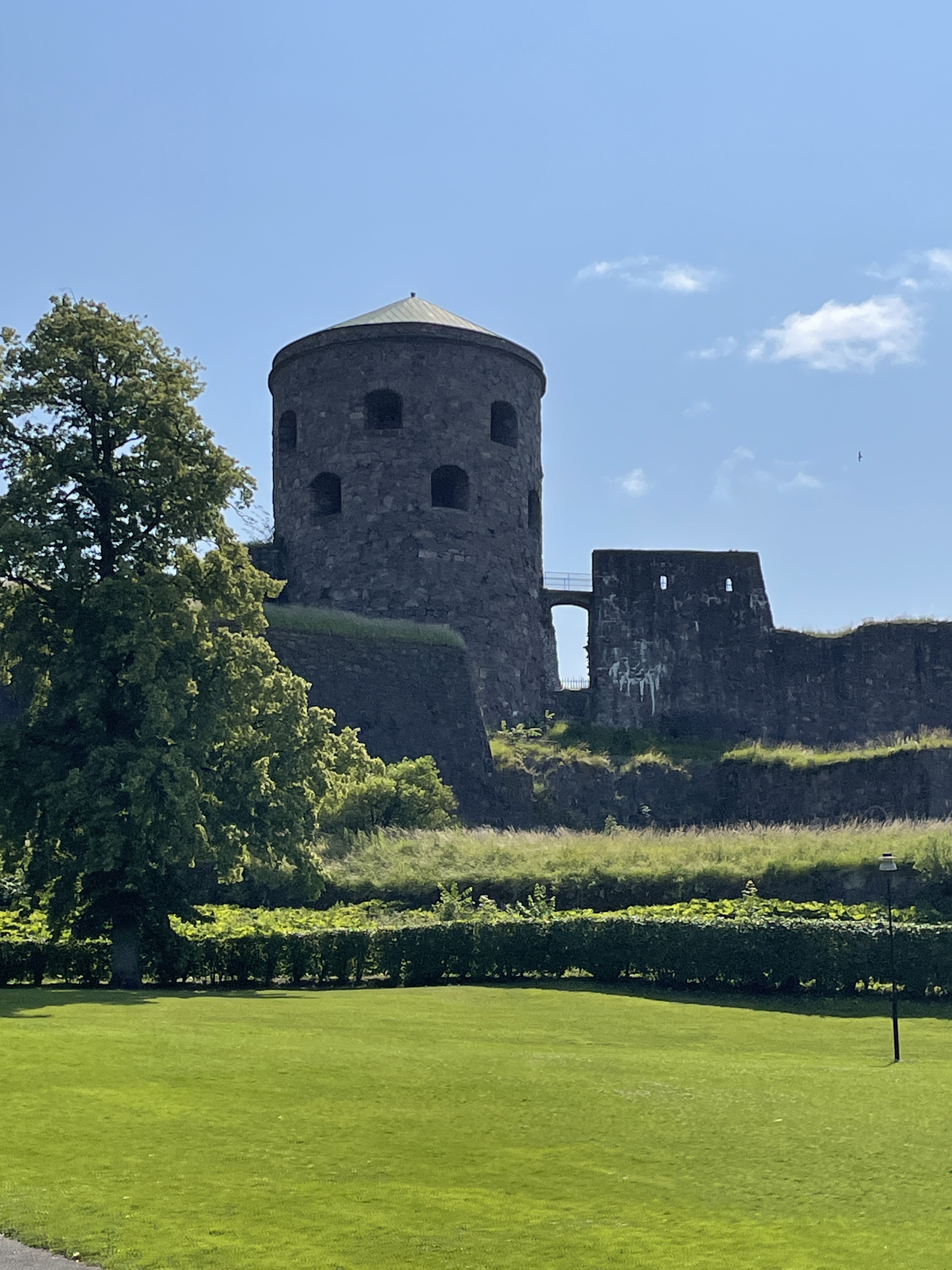
- Bohus Fortress, taken on the left side on the fortress.

Site information
- Controlled by: Sweden, previously by Norway, Kalmar Union and Denmark–Norway

Site history
- Built: 1308
- In use: 1308-1783
- Materials: Granite, brick, wood

Bohus Fortress lies in Kungälv, Bohuslän, Sweden, north east from Hisingen where the Göta river splits into two branches (20 km (12 mi) north of Gothenburg). It commands the surrounding area from a cliff 40 m (130 ft) high, with the river forming a natural moat around it. The fortress used to be situated along the old Norwegian–Swedish border.

== Initial construction ==
The construction of Bohus Fortress (Norwegian: Båhus festning, Swedish: Bohus fästning) began in 1308 under King Haakon V Magnuson, king of Norway from 1299 to 1319. Håkon V also initiated construction of Norwegian fortresses at Akershus and Vardøhus as part of a broader defensive policy. At the time Bohuslän (Båhuslen) was Norwegian territory and served as the main Norwegian defence against Sweden, along the coast as well as the strong point for the Bohuslän region from 1308 to 1658.

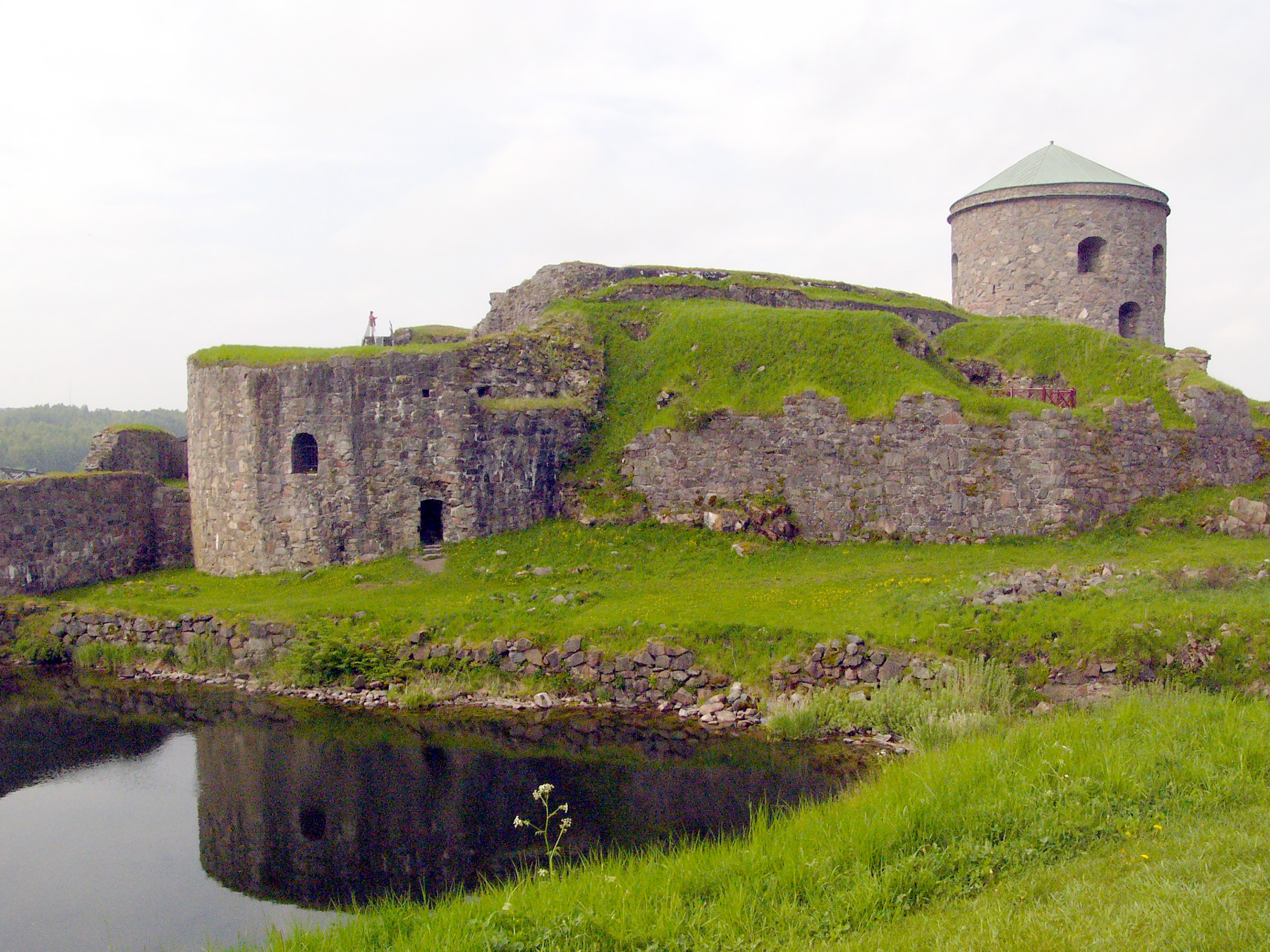
Bohus Fortress

== Medieval castle ==
According to architect Guthorm Kavli:

By 1310, records show it was constructed, as normal for that period, out of granite and brick, perhaps under the guidance of Count Jacob of Halland. By 1450, it included a continuous surrounding wall, 3 metres thick at the base, with a height which varied from 8.5 to 13.5 metres, varying with the terrain. It was approximately rectangular, with four rectangular corner towers. At the eastern end there was a brick tower, and in the centre of the west side a gate house and drawbridge. Along the inside of the surrounding wall buildings were located which among other things included the 'Kings hall', the castle commander's residence, the chapel, the guardroom, the barracks and the kitchen. The fortress had secure vaulted positions, partly cut into the mountain, and beyond that strong outer-works. At the time Båhus was Norway's strongest fortress. The approaches were very difficult and the area to be defended was small, only 250 x 150 metres, so it did not require a large defensive force.

== Fortress ==
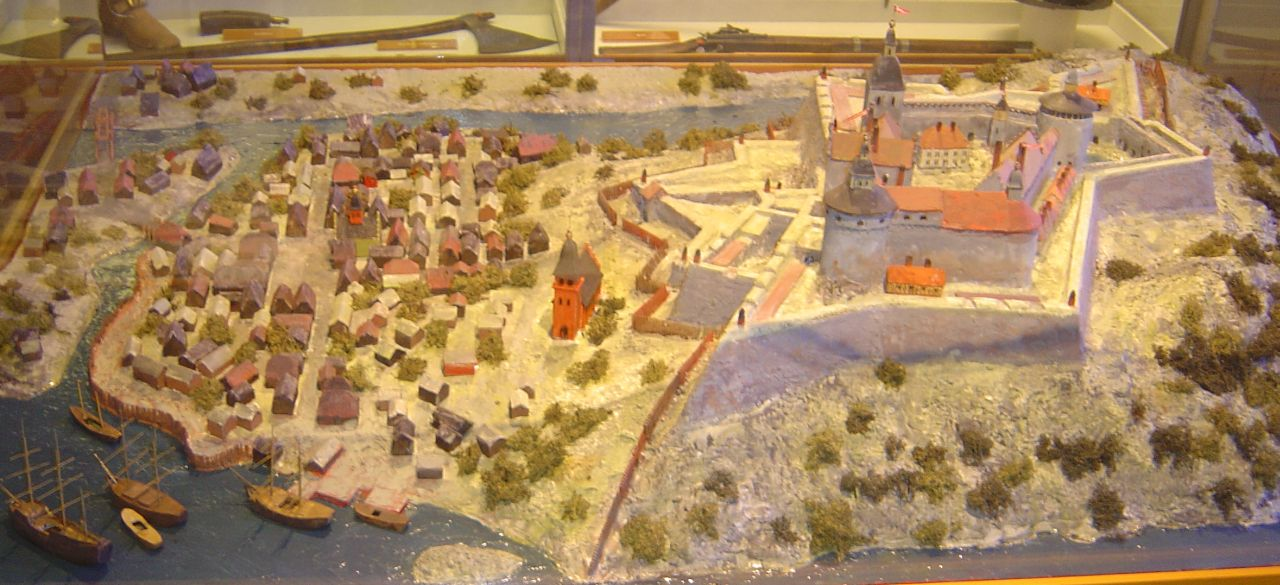
Picture of model of Bohus Fortress, as it was before it was ceded to the Swedes

The fortress was attacked or besieged 14 times, but was never captured. In February 1564, the fortress was unsuccessfully besieged by a Swedish army. Later, it was seriously damaged. This occurred in 1566, when Swedish forces successfully stormed the 'Red Tower' in the northeast of the fortress. Two men from the garrison volunteered to detonate the tower's magazine, causing a massive explosion (the "Bohus Bang") which killed hundreds of Swedish soldiers and thwarted the attack. As a reward the family of one of the volunteers received a piece of land which is still owned by his descendants.

The Norwegians rebuilt the fortress of stone and brick, and reinforced it substantially. The reconstruction immediately after the war was directed by Hans Paaske (Påske) from the Netherlands. On 1 January 1590 James VI of Scotland and his wife Anne of Denmark came to Bohus. They gave Henrik Gyldenstierne, Captain of Bohus, a ring and a gold chain worth 3,000 Danish dalers. Gyldenstierne gave James a firearm and a sword.

In 1593–1604, similar to the construction then undertaken at Akershus in Oslo, Bohus was upgraded to a bastion fortress. A new outer fortification was raised. This construction was one of the early works of Hans van Steenwinckel, also from the Netherlands, who later became noted for his Dutch Renaissance style design in Denmark.

In August 1645, the fortress was bombarded by a Swedish force led by Lars Kagg during the Torstenson War.

As Swedish invasions continuously threatened Norwegian Båhuslen during this time period, the improvement of the fortifications went on for years. For example, starting in the summer of 1651 and until the autumn of 1652, the Dutch engineer Isaac van Geelkerck supervised the construction of two corner towers along the south façade and a new ring wall that was constructed around the arsenal building.

== Loss to Sweden ==
Under the terms of the Treaty of Roskilde in 1658, Denmark–Norway ceded the Danish provinces of Scania, Blekinge and Halland (the latter was agreed to belong to Sweden for a period of 30 years after the Peace of Brömsebro, but was given to Sweden permanently in the treaty of Roskilde) and the Norwegian provinces Trøndelag and Bohuslän (including the Bohus Fortress).

== Last Siege ==
After an unsuccessful attempt to recapture the fortress in 1676, a Norwegian army under the command of Ulrik Frederik Gyldenløve returned in June 1678 and besieged it again. Some 850 defenders faced 16.000 attackers, who fired 20-30.000 iron gun shots, 2265 "bombs" with chemical and biological content, 384 explosive grenades, 384 "great stone boulders", 161 glowing fire shots, 79 sacks filled with grenades and 600 "great mortar rounds". Also a number of mines was exploded under the outer walls. After six weeks of constant battering, the fortress was saved by an approaching Swedish detachment. At this time, there was 400 survivors in the fortress, 300 dead, and 120 wounded "who had their arms and legs shot off". The fortress itself was almost completely ruined and the repairs went on for some 50–70 years, but with small financial support and only the most important work was done.

After Denmark–Norway ceded the territory which included Bohus Fortress, Fredriksten Fortress was constructed in Fredrikshald on the newly established Norwegian-Swedish border.

Since the Bohus Fortress no longer lay on the border, it was of small use to Sweden, which relied on the existing New Älvsborg at Gothenburg and the new Carlsten Fortress built at Marstrand.

== Prison ==
Instead the fortress was used as a prison. The most noted prisoner was the radical pietist Thomas Leopold, who spent 42 years of his life behind bars, 32 of those at Bohus, for his alleged heresies. His stone-clad cell still exists in the castle.

In the tower Fars Hatt, the original dungeon is still visible from above. A report from the 18th century states this as "a great depth, which has a floor of an iron net, upon which the delinquent has to walk and sleep. The floor accepts all their faeces, but then returns an unbearable stench, that soon makes the poor prisoner confess whatever crime he has committed". In those days, you were only put in prison until you confessed - then you got your immediate punishment: fine, shame, dismembering or death. Today the floor is more forgiving, but it still gives you a hint on what it might have been to sit "in the tower".

In the tower of Sven Hall, an old medieval dungeon has also been discovered, but it is hardly visible today. Probably it was no better than the one mentioned above, since evidence suggest that it was along the sewer exit from the fortress. Today it can be reached only by professionals, and is not visible except from the small daylight opening.

== Modern times ==
At the end of the 18th century, it was decided that the now unused fortress should be demolished. Demolition crews worked at the fortress for two months, after that the money allocated for the job had run out. Residents of the nearby town of Kungälv used the dressed stone from the fortress to build houses. However, much of the fortress is still intact, including the large northern tower, Fars hatt ("Father's hat"). As of 2015, the fortress is a museum open to visitors during summer.

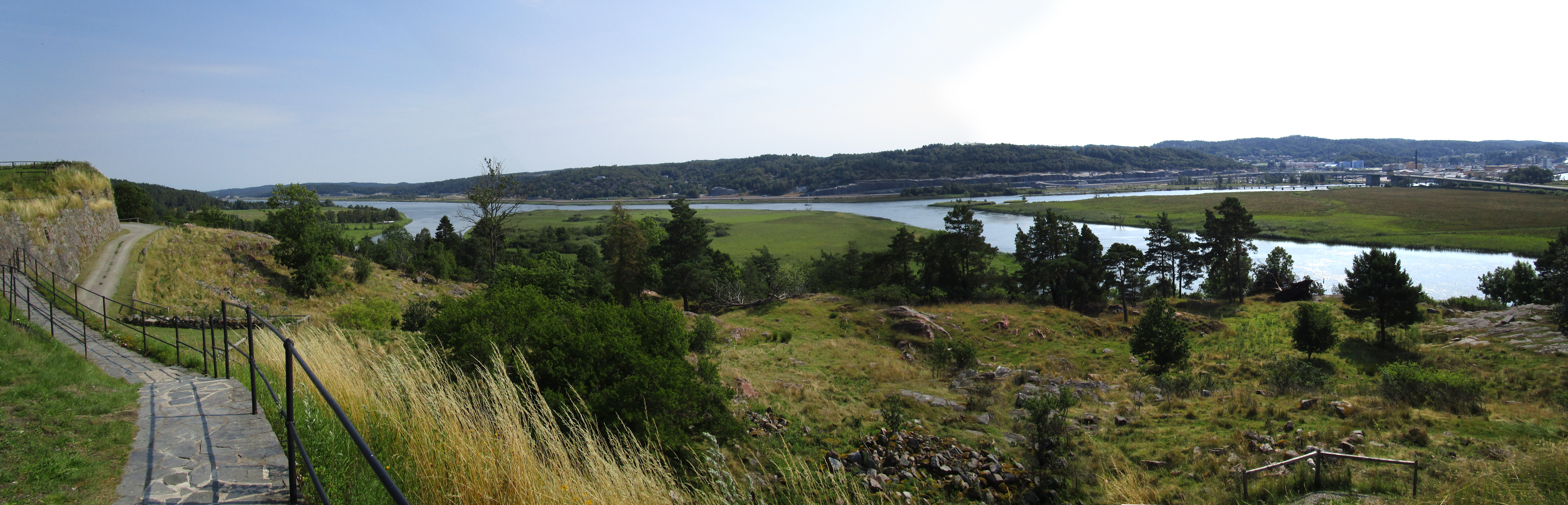
Panorama from the Bohus Fortress of the Göta river dividing into Göta river and Norder river (down right)

== See also ==
- Siege of Bohus fortress (1678)

== Works cited ==
- Munthe, Carl Oscar (1901). Hannibalsfejden 1644–1645: Den norske hærs bloddåb [Hannibal's feud 1644–1645: The Norwegian army's blood baptism] (in Danish). Oslo: Grøndahl & Søns bogtrykkeri.
- Lindbergh, Katarina Harrison (2022-10-26). Nordiska sjuårskriget [Northern Seven Years' War] (in Swedish). Cover by Per Idborg. Historiska Media. ISBN 9789180500951.
