= Battle of Rügen (1565) =

1565 conflict

- Part of Northern Seven Years' War
| Date | 21 May 1565 |
| Location | Baltic Sea, off the island of Rügen (in modern-day Germany); North of Pomerania |
| Result | Swedish victory |

Belligerents
| Sweden | Denmark; Lübeck |

Commanders and leaders
| Klas Horn | Peder Huitfeldt |

Strength
| 48 ships 1,638 guns 8,000 men | (Denmark) 6 ships 3 ships |

Casualties and losses
| Unknown | 4 ships burnt, 5 ships captured |

The Battle of Rügen was a naval battle near the island of Rügen (in modern Germany), that took place on 21 May 1565 between an allied fleet of 6 Danish and 3 Lübeck ships, and a Swedish fleet of 48 ships with a total of 1,638 guns and 8,000 men under Klas Horn. The Swedish fleet was victorious, and 4 of the allied ships were burned, while the remaining 5 were captured.

On 21 May, eight Danish ship were found north of Pomerania. They were there to prevent Swedish ships getting to or from Greifswald. Four of the ships fled into Greifswald to escape the Swedes but they chose to burn the other four ships to prevent them falling into enemy hands.

Klas Horn planned to attack them inside the harbor, but after negotiations with the Duke of Pomerania, it was decided that the ships would be taken care of by the Duke on behalf of Sweden, pending a peace agreement, and their flags submitted to the Swedish admiral.
