= Action of 7 July 1565 =

Coordinates: 55.293°N 14.649°E

- Part of Northern Seven Years' War
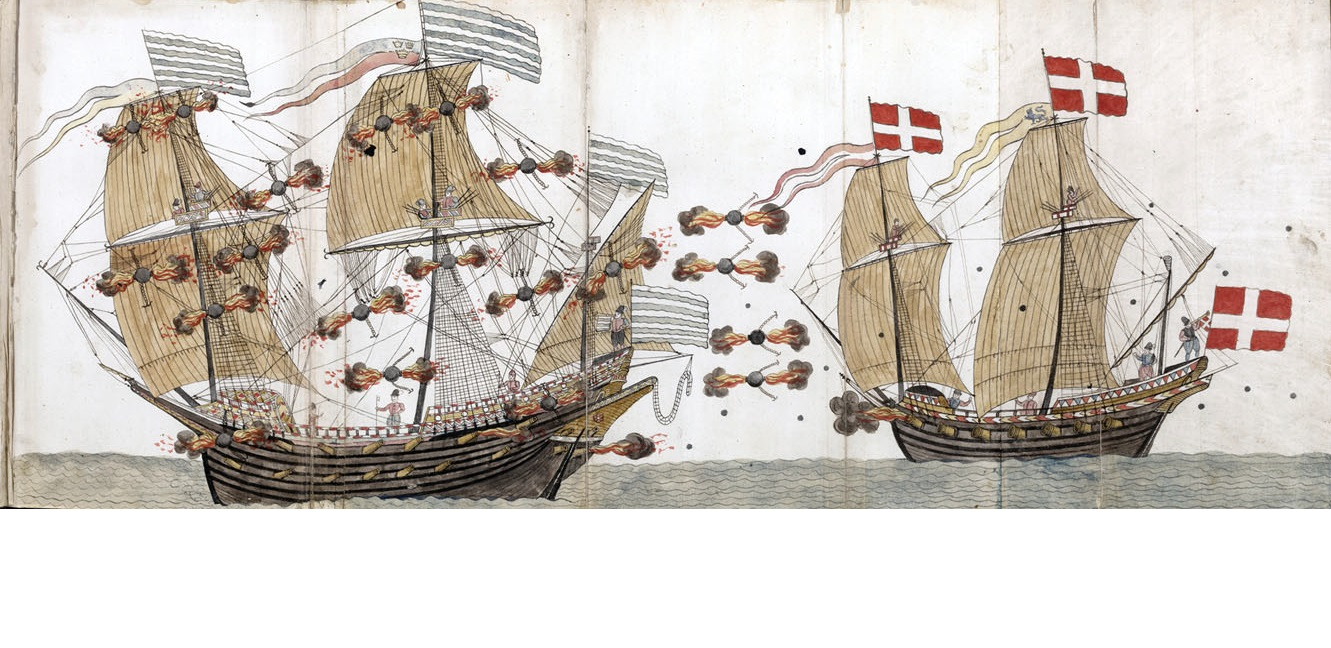
- Fighting between the Swedish and Danish flag ships St Erik and Jegermesther, drawn by Rudolf van Deventer.
Date	7 July 1565
Location	Baltic Sea near Bornholm
Result	Swedish victory

Belligerents
Sweden	Denmark–Norway; Free City of Lübeck

Commanders and leaders
(Sweden) Klas Horn	(Denmark–Norway) Otte Rud

Strength
49 ships	36 ships

Casualties and losses
3 ships lost 362 dead 523 wounded	3 ships lost Approximately 4,000 dead and wounded

This battle in the Northern Seven Years' War took place on 7 July 1565 and was a decisive victory for a Swedish fleet of 49 ships, under Klas Horn, over a combined Danish and Lübecker fleet of 36 ships, under Otte Rud.

== Battle ==
The Danish Dans Christopher was sunk and Trolle drowned but some of her survivors boarded and captured the small Swedish ship St Goran. The Swedish Grip was rammed and sunk by a larger Lübeck ship, which also sank as a result. After the Swedish ship Gyllende Lejon caught fire the fleets scattered, leaving the Danish flagship, Jegermesther, unsupported and she was captured at about 9:30 pm. After this the Allies returned to Copenhagen, and the Swedes to Dalarö. Swedish vice-admiral Sten Sture and his captain, Baner, were killed.

== Ships involved ==
=== Sweden ===
- St Erik 90 (flag)
- Finska Svan 82 (Vice Admiral Sten Sture, captain Baner)
- David 42
- Troilus 44
- Svenska Hektor 87
- Grip — rammed and sunk
- Böse Lejon 56 (ex-Danish Byens Løffue)
- St Goran — captured
- Gyllende Lejon / Forgylden Lejon — burnt
- 40 (or possibly 53?) other ships

=== Denmark/Lübeck ===
- Jegermesther 90 (flag) — captured
- Svenske Jomfru (Erik Rud)
- Dans Christopher (Nils Trolle) — sank
- Josua (Lübeck flag)
- Unknown ship (Lübeck) — sank after ramming
- 19 other Danish ships
- 12 other Lübeck ships
