= Siege of Bohus Fortress (1564) =

Part of the Northern Seven Years' War

- Part of the Northern Seven Years' War
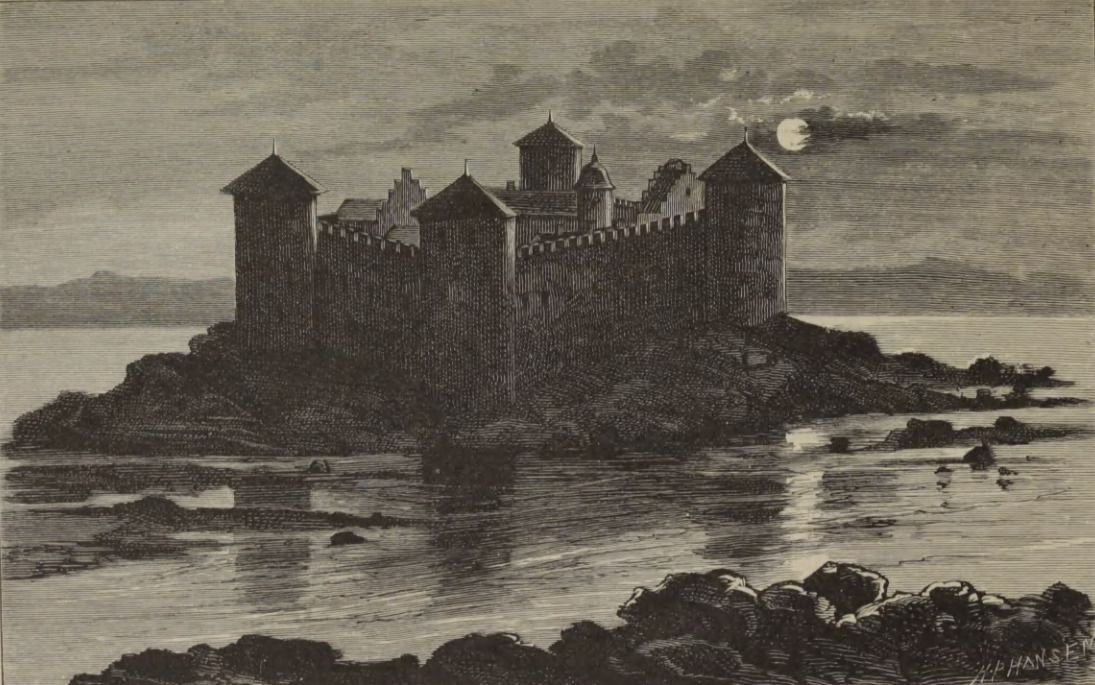
- Depiction of Bohus in 1550 by H.P. Hansen
Date	23–24 February 1564
Location	Bohus Fortress, Denmark–Norway (present-day Sweden) 57°51′42″N 11°59′58″E
Result	Danish victory
Territorial changes	Swedish forces withdraw into Västergötland

Belligerents
Denmark–Norway	Sweden

Commanders and leaders
Jens Holgersson Ulfstand	Klas Horn; Gustaf Olofsson Stenbock; Klaus Fleming

Units involved
Bohus garrison	Five cavalry Fähnlein (Note: On paper); Seven knight Fähnlein

Strength
Unknown	c. 3,500 or <5,000 men 7 guns

Casualties and losses
1,000 killed (Note: According to Gustaf Stedt and Axel Emanuel Holmberg, the reported Danish losses are unlikely, as they doubted a single day of limited bombardment would have caused such casualties.)	1,400 dead (Note: Most froze to death)

The siege of Bohus Fortress occurred from 23 to 24 February during the Northern Seven Years' War between Denmark and Sweden.

On 20 January, a Swedish army under the command of Klas Horn, Gustaf Olofsson Stenbock, and Klaus Fleming, was ordered to besiege Bohus Fortress by Erik XIV. On 22 February, the Swedish army arrived outside the fortress. The Danish garrison was commanded by Jens Holgersen Ulfstand, consisting of three Fähnlein and some marksmen.

The Swedes demanded the Danes capitulate, threatening to kill every man, woman, and child if they refused. The demand was refused, and the Swedes began bombarding the fortress. However, the bombardment quickly ended, as hunger-typhus had broken out in the Swedish camp and morale began sinking. The Swedes withdrew back to Västergötland on 24 February.

== Background ==
Following a battle at Bornholm between the Danish and Swedish fleets in May 1563, Denmark declared war on Sweden later that year on 9 August, sparking the Northern Seven Years' War.

=== Prelude ===
==== Siege of 1563 ====
After being notified that Älvsborg had been captured by Danish forces, Per Brahe the Elder marched into Dalsland in September 1563, later skirmishing with Danish forces in Bohuslän and preventing them from raiding Swedish territory. Later, in November, he invaded Bohuslän, burning Kungahälla and forcing the people in the southern part of the province to swear fealty to Erik XIV. A siege of Bohus Fortress was also initiated, but as winter approached, the Swedes retreated from the fortress. Additionally, the commander of Akershus Fortress, Christen Munk, forced a complete Swedish retreat from Bohuslän in the subsequent month.

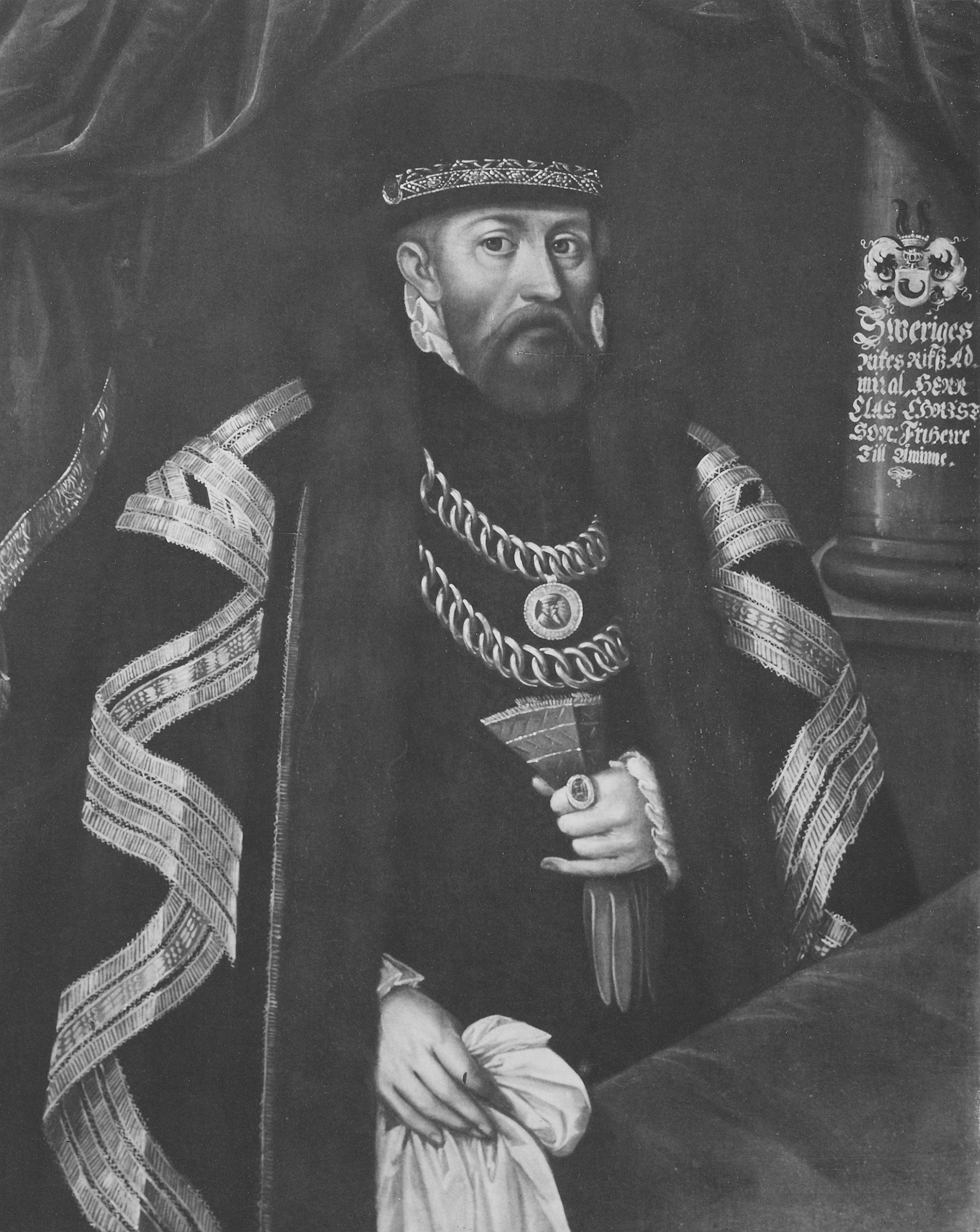
Depiction of Klas Horn by an unknown artist

On 20 January, Klas Horn and Gustaf Olofsson Stenbock were ordered by Erik to besiege Bohus and Älvsborg. Horn's army was supposed to have seven Fähnlein of knights and five Fähnlein of cavalry, altogether around 5,000 men. However, two Fähnlein were missing, and thus the army was smaller. According to Arnold Munthe, the Swedish army consisted of around 3,500 men. Horn and Stenbock were supported by artillery led by Klaus Fleming.

== Siege ==
The Swedish army crossed the frozen Göta älv, during which they lost a large mortar called "Skäggan", arriving outside Bohus on 22 February. The Danish fortress garrison was commanded by Jens Holgersen Ulfstand and consisted of three fähnlein and some marksmen from Jørgen Holle's regiment.

On 23 February, the Swedes fired the Swedish password and sent a trumpeter demanding the Danish garrison surrender. According to the Swedish demands, if Ulfstand surrendered, all troops within the castle would be spared. However, if Ulfstand did not surrender, they would kill everyone, including women and children.

In response, Ulfstand said that the siege would end like the previous siege: the bones of the Swedes would be bleached upon the banks of the Göta älv. The Swedes opened fire on the castle following the negative reply. Five heavy cannons and two mortars bombarded the castle tower Fars hatt from the mountains Fontin and Rödakon. However, the Swedish bombardment ceased after the cannons had fired five or six times, in total 445 rounds, and the mortars had fired twice. Hunger-typhus broke out in the Swedish camp, the troops sold their weapons for bread and many deserted as well. Swedish morale sank as casualties rose.

The Swedes lifted the siege and withdrew on 24 February.

== Aftermath ==
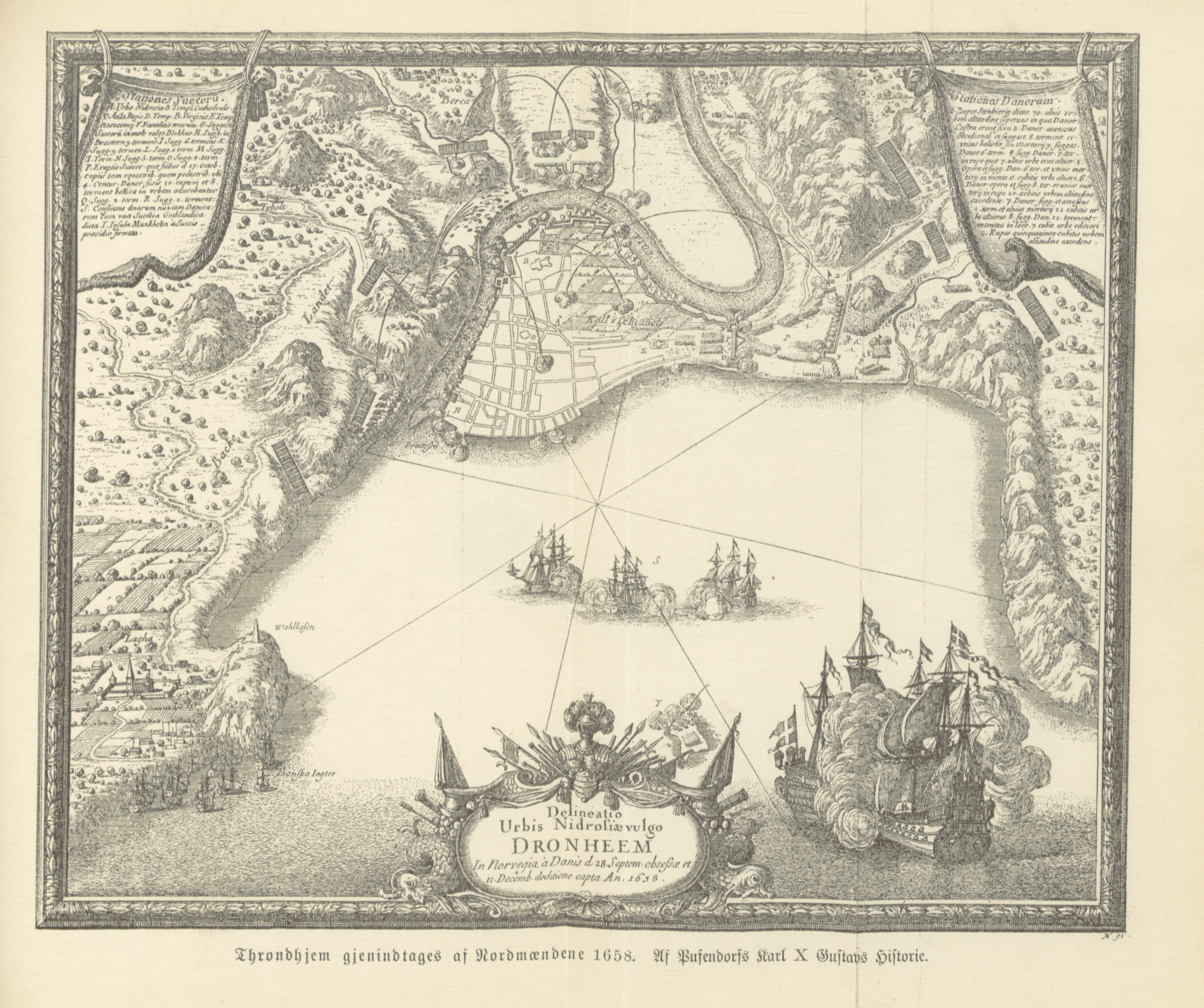
Illustration of Trondheim in 1658 by Erik Dahlberg, published in 1885

In total, the Swedes suffered 1,400 casualties, most of whom froze to death. The Danes suffered 1,000 casualties, though this figure is doubted by Gustaf Stedt and Axel Emanuel Holmberg, who say it was impossible for so many to die from a limited bombardment. Julius Mankell shares their doubt.

Following the siege, the Swedes withdrew to Västergötland. Despite unsuccessfully besieging Bohus, the Swedes achieved their main objective, which was to distract Norwegian forces from Claudius Collart's invasion of Norway. The distraction allowed him to capture Trondheim.

Erik XIV complained about the failed siege, claiming that Klas Horn had merely wasted a great deal of gunpowder for nothing.

== See also ==
- Bohus Bang – 1566 explosion in Bohus
