= Siege of Bohus Fortress (1678) =

Danish siege against Sweden 1678

Coordinates: 57°51′42″N 11°59′58″E

Siege of Bohus fortress
- Part of the Scanian War
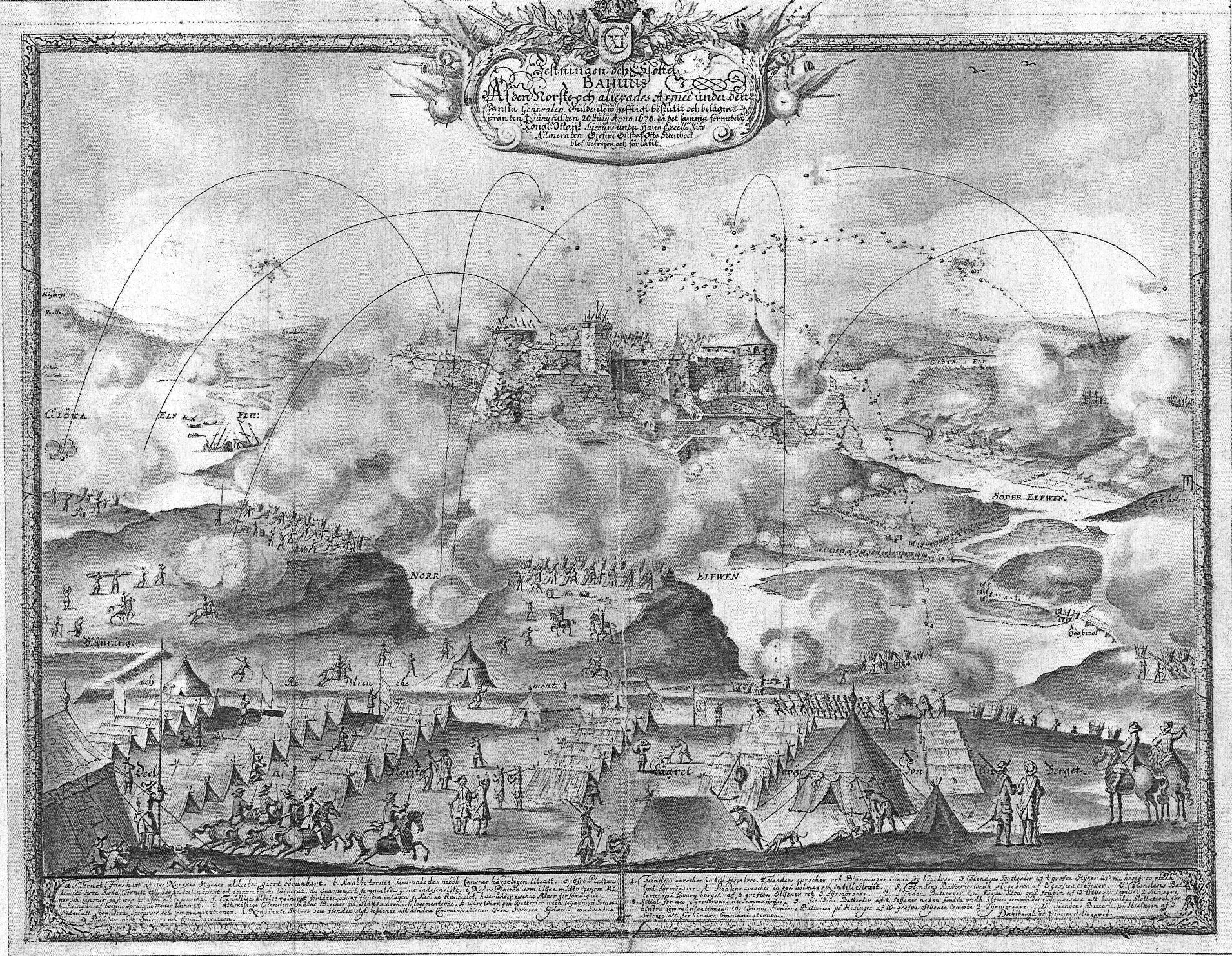
- Depiction of the siege by Erik Dahlbergh
Date	June 4 – July 23, 1678
Location	Kungälv, Sweden
Result	Swedish victory

Belligerents
(yes) Swedish Empire	Denmark–Norway

Commanders and leaders
(Swedish Empire) Friedrich von Börstell (Swedish Empire) Carl Gustaf Frölich (Swedish Empire) Gustaf Otto Stenbock	(Denmark–Norway) Ulrik Frederik Gyldenløve

Strength
Bohus garrison: 400; Relief force: 12,000	12,000–15,000

Casualties and losses
Heavy	Unknown

The siege of Bohus fortress was a siege by Dano–Norwegian troops during the Scanian War. The Swedish defenders endured the siege for weeks before being relieved by reinforcements and forcing a Dano–Norwegian retreat.

== Background ==
In 1672, France had become a powerful and expansive country, which had caused them to look to the Netherlands as their next target. Sweden's situation at the time was precarious, as the treasury was empty and Danish revenge plans for previous wars were a constant threat. As a solution, the two nations entered into an alliance with each other on the 4th of April, 1672, primarily targeted towards the Netherlands. According to the treaty, Sweden is to intervene against the German princes who try to support the Netherlands in the event of a French attack. In return, Sweden is to receive extensive subsidies and guarantees that France will not support a Danish attack on Sweden.

== Siege ==
At the end of May 1678, Danish-Norwegian General Ulrik Frederik Gyldenløve advanced over the Swedish–Norwegian border with 12,000–15,000 men towards Bohus. In order to more effectively besiege Bohus, it was necessary to take control of Hisingen, which had a garrison of 600 men under the command of Hans Christoffer Kock von Crimstein. Due to his numerical inferiority, Kock retreated from the island on May 24. After the arrival of the Dano–Norwegian forces, they immediately set up batteries on the island. On the evening of June 4, after the Swedes had refused to surrender, they opened a deadly barrage on the Bohus garrison, which consisted of 400 men under the command of Fredrich von Börstell and Carl Gustaf Fröhlich.

During the initial Dano–Norwegian assault, the Swedish defenders signed an agreement to not mention the word "surrender" and to instead fight till the last man. Anyone who spoke of surrender was considered a traitor and was executed as punishment.

In late June, the Dano–Norwegian cannon fire had caused massive damage to the fortress. By June 17, the Blockhouse and so-called "Alarm Place" were completely destroyed. The outer works had been nearly fully destroyed, providing little to no protection. Most of the cannons were also either damaged or destroyed. Many skilled engineers had been wounded or killed.

After recognizing the immense impact of the bombardment on the fortress, Gyldenløve suggested a direct assault. However, other generals, especially Schack, advised against it. Despite Gyldenløve's military experience, the assault was refused.

Meanwhile, the situation of the defenders was dire. The iron gate on the Hisingen side had been heavily bombarded by the enemy cannons on the island. The cannons caused significant damage to the gate and the nearby wall. Any attempts to repair the damage during night time was risky and dangerous, since all outer defenses were in ruins and providing no protection. The process of filling the breaches with stones and turf was perilous, causing at least 20 men to die for each repair attempt. The Swedish communication lines had also been cut and the men began to starve.

Facing these challenges, Friedrich von Börstell wrote to Gustaf Otto Stenbock on June 18 requesting reinforcements. In response to his request, Stenbock sent 100 men under the command of a man named "Edington" who departed on June 19. Unfortunately for the Swedes, 60 of the reinforcing troops were killed or injured, including Edington, who had died on June 21 from severe wounds to his right arm. Despite these challenges, the intense barrage continued, and the fortress was increasingly surrounded by the besiegers.

The besiegers then attempted to build a bridge from Hisingen to Bohus, but were stopped by a successful counterattack by Börstell, who burned the bridge. When the Dano–Norwegians arrived in greater numbers he was forced to retreat inside the fortress. The Dano–Norwegians were however undeterred and repaired the bridge and advanced toward Skarpenort. Despite occasional reinforcements, the fortress sustained major damage, with the besiegers setting mines and initiating a blockade.

Stenbock succeeded in assembling a force consisting of cavalry and militia, and he reached Bohus on July 17, additional measures to alleviate the siege such as destroying the retreat bridge at Kviström were undertaken.

=== Swedish relief ===
Stenbock later began a march with an army estimated to be 12,000 in size towards Bohus on July 18. Before his departure, Stenbock had a bridge constructed to Hisingen, accompanied by armed barges and multiple pontoon bridges for protection during their crossing. The Swedish army succeeded in crossing during the night of July 18–19. By morning, the entire army had crossed to the island, Stenbock sent a captain with 60 men to secure a nearby hill, leading to a confrontation with the Danes. Swedish reinforcements under Colonel Mörner and Lieutenant Colonel Gripensköld repelled the Danes and sustained 30 casualties. The day after, the Swedish army passed through the Quillån pass, facing no resistance. There was also a detachment of musketeers who circumvented a mountain to make sure the army was not ambushed. Around midday, the Swedish army reached a height close to Bohus, signalling the besieged with double Swedish signals, the Danes, who were stationed at Gullön, had constructed a fortification and bridge over the river to communicate with the mainland. The Swedish army successfully forced the Danes to retreat on the night of July 22, destroying their fortifications, bridges, and camp. A day later, the Dano–Norwegian force abandoned Fontin and withdrew, leaving behind artillery and unexploded bombs.

== Aftermath ==
Bohus fortress, having been successfully relieved, displayed massive damage after the relentless bombardment. The weapons to inflict the damage included 2,265 large bombs, 200 glowing bullets, and 75 baskets of hand grenades.
