= Action of 4 June 1565 =

Naval battle of the Northern Seven Years' War

- Part of Northern Seven Years' War
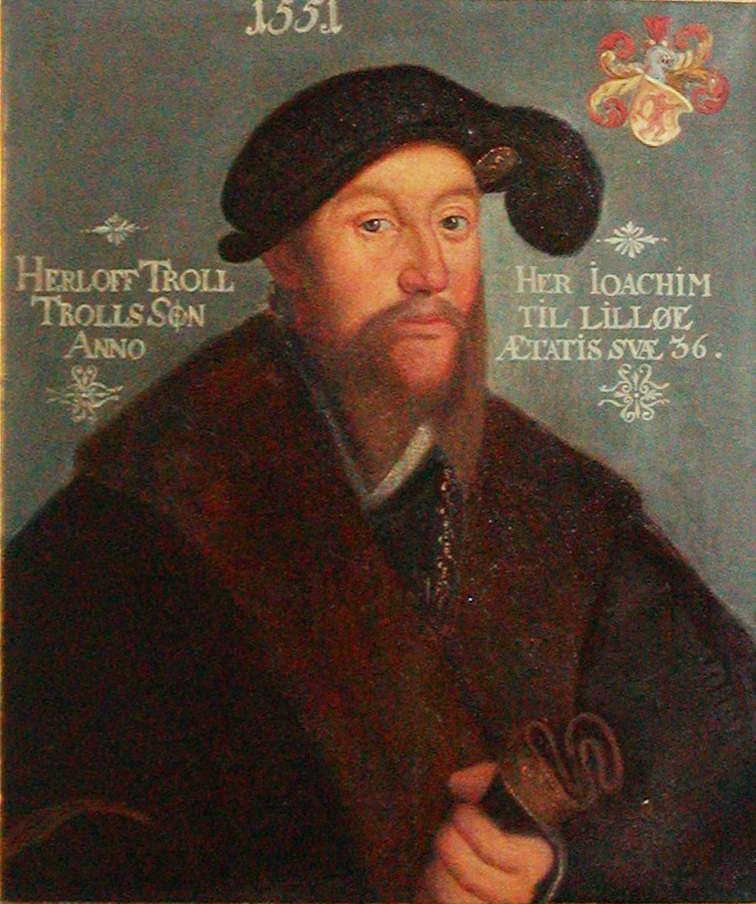
- Admiral Herluf Trolle in 1551
Date	4 June 1565
Location	Bay of Mecklenburg 54°18′N 11°42′E
Result	Swedish victory

Belligerents
Sweden	Denmark–Norway; Lübeck

Commanders and leaders
(Sweden) Klas Horn	(Denmark–Norway) Herluf Trolle (WIA)

Units involved
(Swedish Empire) Sankt Erik (Swedish Empire) Finska Svan (Swedish Empire) Svenska Hektor (Swedish Empire) Herkules (Swedish Empire) Engel (Swedish Empire) Pelikan (Swedish Empire) Troilus (Swedish Empire) Fuchs	(Denmark–Norway) Jegermesther (Denmark–Norway) Merkurius (Denmark–Norway) Svenske Jomfru

Strength
49 ships (including merchant ships)	33 ships

Casualties and losses
Unknown	700 men

This battle took place on 4 June 1565 between an allied fleet of 33 Danish and Lübecker ships, under Trolle, and a Swedish fleet of around 49 ships, under Klas Horn. Afterward, the Danes retired to Køge Bay, south of Copenhagen, where Trolle died of his wounds on 25 June. His second, Jørgen Brahe, died of fever on 28 June.

== Ships involved ==
=== Denmark-Norway/Lübeck ===
- Jegermesther 90 (flag)
- Merkurius (Second in command Jørgen Brahe)
- Svenske Jomfru (Erik Rud)
- 30 others

=== Sweden ===
- St Erik 90 (flag)
- Finska Svan 82
- Svenska Hektor 87 (Per Bagge)
- Herkules 81
- Engel 49
- Pelikan
- Troilus 44 (Shenk)
- Fuchs (ex-Lübecker)?
- 41 or so others
