= Siege of Dansborg (1624) =

Siege on Danish fort in India, 1624

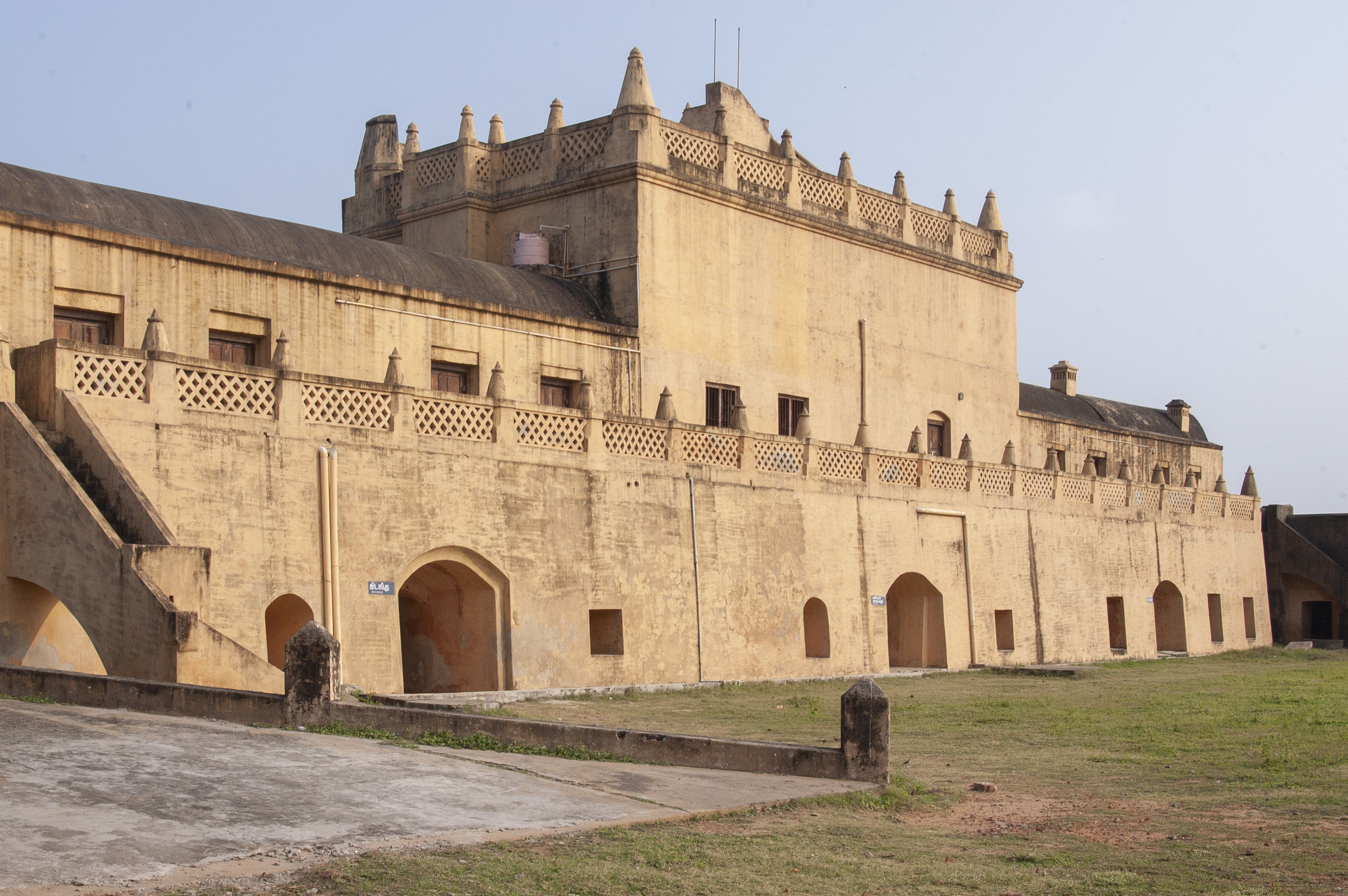
- Fort Dansborg in Tharangambadi, Tamil Nadu
Date	Early 1624
Location	Dansborg, Tranquebar
Result	Danish victory (See aftermath)
Territorial changes	Thanjavur acknowledges Tranquebar as Danish

Belligerents
Danish India	Thanjavur Nayak kingdom

Commanders and leaders
(Danish India) Roland Crappé (Danish India) Henrik Hess (Danish India) Christopher Mohlen (Denmark–Norway) Christopher Boye (Denmark–Norway) Mat Herman	Raghunatha Nayak; Calicut

Units involved
(Denmark–Norway) HDMS Jupiter (Denmark–Norway) HDMS Perlen (Denmark–Norway) HDMS St. Laurentius	Unknown

Strength
30 men 3 ships 2 cannons	(Numbers are exaggerated); 40,000 men 1,000 elephants 1,000 camels 1,000 horses

Casualties and losses
Unknown	Unknown

The siege of Dansborg (Danish; belejringen af Dansborg) or the siege of Fort Dansborg (Danish; belejringen af Fort Dansborg), was a siege of the newly finished Danish fort of Dansborg in Trangebar in 1624. The siege was initiated by the nayak of Thanjavur, Raghunatha, because of the Danish rejection of the demands from the nayak. The siege, laid by general Calicut, was abandoned after the arrival of Danish reinforcements from sea. The event is mostly described by Icelander, Jón Ólafsson, in his work The Life of the Icelander Jón Ólafsson, Traveller to India.

== Background ==
Ove Gjedde

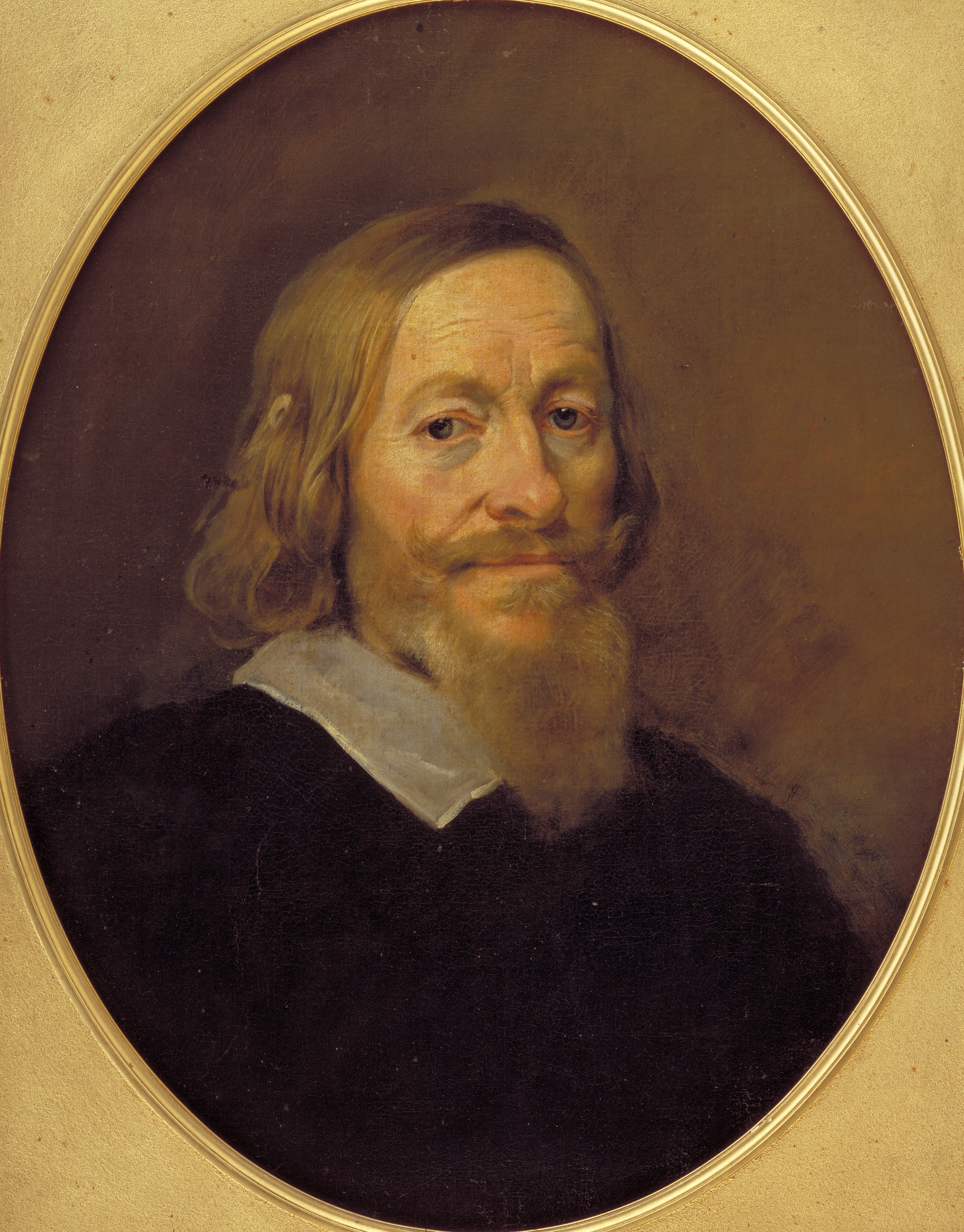
Rigsadmiral Ove Gjedde, by Karel van Mander III

Admiral Ove Gjedde, commander of the Danish East India Company, had in 1620 set out for Asia in the hopes of establishing a colony and monopoly on Ceylon. The Danish ventures on Ceylon proved unsuccessful, yet they managed to conclude a treaty with Raghunatha, Nayak of Thanjavur, on a lease on the fishing village of Tarangambadi (Danish; Trankebar: Portuguese; Tranquebar). Gjedde quickly started the construction on what would become Fort Dansborg. Dansborg would be built in classic Danish style, and would be the second largest Danish fort after Kronborg. Ove Gjedde would leave for Copenhagen on 13 February 1621, yet the constructions would continue until Dansborg stood ready in 1624.

Staying in the colony was, Dutchman Roland Crappé, who was a prominent and experienced seafarer. As consequence of Gjedde's departure, Crappé was announced director and thereby the highest ranked Danish in India. Though, Crappé departed home in 1622, and Tranquebar was left for itself.

=== Prelude ===
In October 1623, Nayak Raghunatha send some of his subjects to deliver a message for him at Tranquebar. The couriers were well received by the governorate at Dansborg. In the letter, Raghunatha demanded a considerable amount of lead, which the rector of Dansborg, Henrik Hess, weren't able to fulfil. Irritated at this response, the couriers quickly left and informed Raghunatha about the situation. Raghunatha, equally frustrated as the couriers, now made an ultimatum, that if his desired amount of lead weren't given, he would relinquish the former treaty, giving the Danes Tranquebar. Again, Hess apologized and explained the situation, yet Raghunatha still sent his Field marshal, Calicut, to Tranquebar with an army. According to traveler, Jón Ólafsson, the Thanjavurian army reached 40.000 men and 1000 camels, horses and elephants, though this is likely to be highly exaggerated.

== Siege ==
On Dansborg, the Thanjavurian threat was imminent, and the fort quickly began preparing for a siege or assault. All cannons were charged, and 800 barrels of water were collected. The governorate called all inhabitants of Tranquebar up to the fort, where they were presented with the choice of joining the preparations or be an outcast, though all joined the defenses. The local Indians, who too guarded the fort, were also represented with a similar choice, yet they also chose to stay. To Danish the demise, the inhabitants got sick and died, and the fort's crew went from 80 to 30 men throughout the winter. Additionally, Dansborg was in worryingly bad conditions for the Danes.

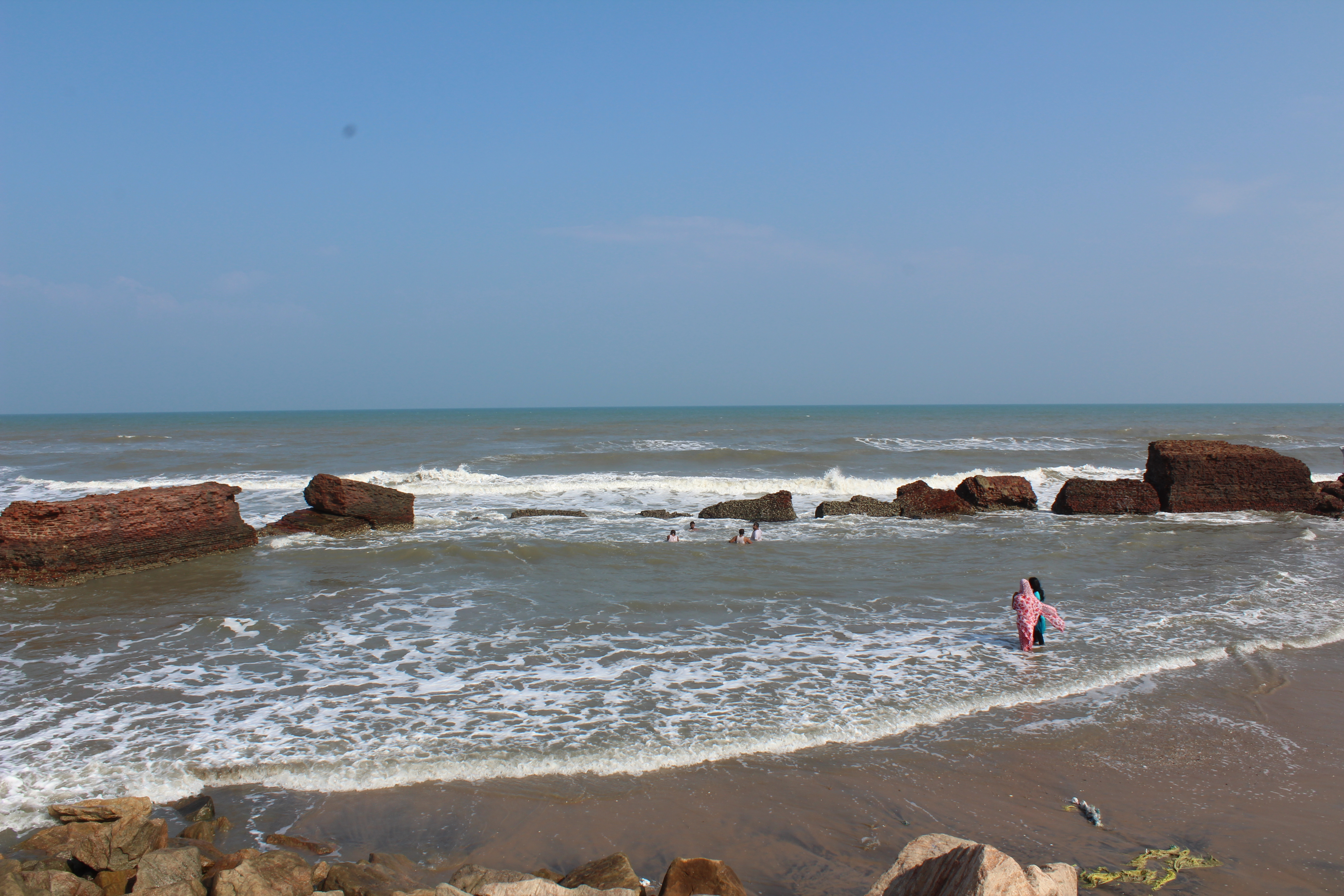
Coast of Tranquebar

After a long march, general Calicut reached the town of Trichlagore, where he would set camp in 14 days.

=== Arrival of St. Laurentius ===
On Passion Sunday 1624 the Danish vessel, St. Laurentius, arrived from Tenasserim to Tranquebar, with Captain Christopher Hansen Boye. The crew at Dansborg hoisted the Dannebrog and saluted the ship by cannon shots. When Calicut heard the shots from his camp, approximately one mile away, he ordered his messengers to investigate. When his messengers notified the general about the arrival of St. Laurentius, he ordered his army to march half a mile to Tranquebar, where they would lay the week to Palm Sunday.

Jón Ólafsson on the arrival of Perlen and Jupiter

"When we went down from the fortress to the beach, where four Indians were waiting for us with a boat, we saw a new sight that filled us with great joy: two Ships with snow-white sails and flying pennants The mast top came sailing from the South! We knew immediately Perlen, the big ship of 700 loads, and Jupiter, the small warship"

— The Life of the Icelander Jón Ólafsson, Traveller to India.

== Arrival of Perlen and Jupiter ==
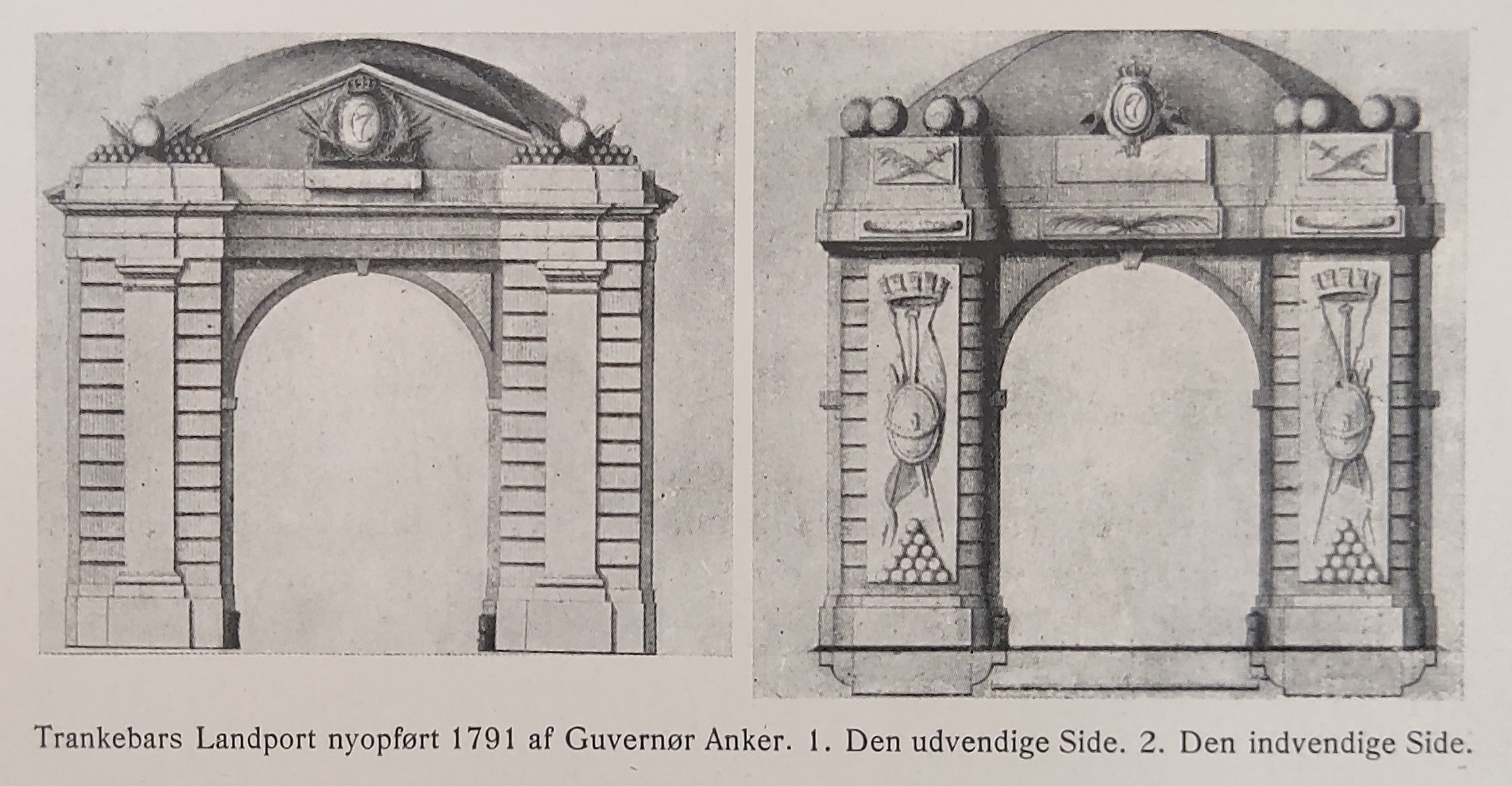
Dansborg fort entrance, 1791

Back in Denmark, Roland Crappé was on 25 March 1623 made general and commander of East India, and on 27 March he set sail for Tranquebar on the vessel, Perlen, accompanied by the smaller vessel, Jupiter. On 14 March 1624, they arrived on the coast of Dansborg. They were, too, well-received and Dansborg again hoisted its flag and saluted the ships. 9 cannon shots were fired in honour of Crappé. When Calicut heard the shots, he and 500 men stood outside the fortress gate. He, too, was honoured with 9 cannon shots, after which he was let in.

== Negotiations and aftermath ==
Calicut began negotiations with the governorate, and stated that Henrik Hess was to blame for the hostilities. Though, Crappé showcased Calicut all the fortification's cannons, which all shot in honour for Calicut, in which the two copper cannons on Perlen proudly did the same.

According to Ólafsson, Calicut is said to have asked Crappé, if the ship's cannons were bigger than that of Dansborg's, to which Crappé replied yes. This made a big impact on Calicut, and a peace was subsequently concluded. Afterwards, Roland Crappé and Nayak Raghunatha exchanged expensive gifts. Crappé would go on to rule the company for 12 more years, in which he would expand trade and commerce.

== See also ==
- Ove Gjedde – Danish nobleman and Admiral of the Realm
- Cattle War – Conflict between Danish India and the Thanjavur Maratha kingdom
- Siege of Dansborg (1644) – Siege in Tranquebar, India 1644
- Willem Leyel's siege of Dansborg – Siege of Fort Dansborg, 1644
- Grounding of the Jupiter – 1625 grounding of a Danish ship
