= Roland Crappé's raids on Portuguese colonies =

Danish raids in India and Sri Lanka, 1619

- Part of Sinhalese–Portuguese conflicts and Thirty Years' War outside Europe
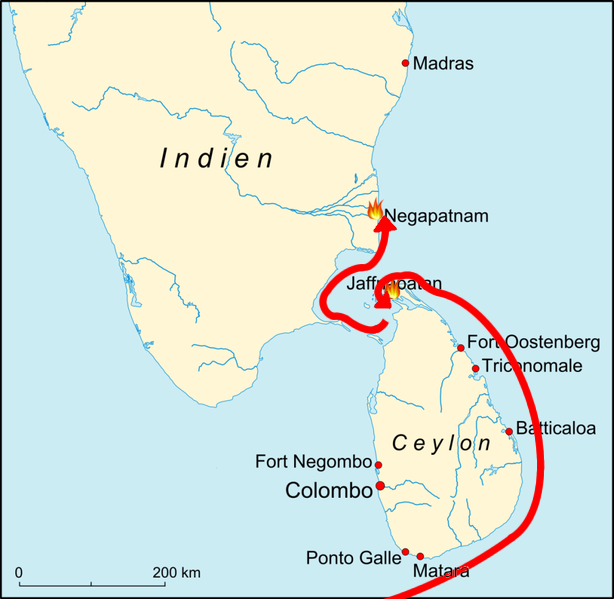
- Map of Roland Crappé's campaign, 1619
| Date | January – 24 September 1619 |
| Location | Coromandel Coast; Ceylon |
| Result | Portuguese victory |

Belligerents
| Denmark-Norway; (Danish India) East India Company; Kingdom of Kandy; Supported by: Thanjavur Nayak | Portuguese Empire; (Portuguese Empire) Portuguese India |

Commanders and leaders
| (Danish India) Roland Crappé (WIA); Senarath Adahasin Raghunatha Nayak | (Portuguese Empire) João Coutinho (Portuguese Empire) Fernão de Albuquerque |

Units involved
| (Denmark–Norway) Øresund | Unknown |

Strength
| ~44 men 1 ship | 7 ships 5 sampans 2 catamarans |

Casualties and losses
| 1 ship 27 imprisoned 4 killed | 5 Sampans |

Roland Crappé's raids on Portuguese colonies (Danish; Roland Crappés plyndringer på portugisiske kolonier: Portuguese; Os ataques de Roland Crappé às colónias portuguesas) refers to a series of raids by Dutchman in Danish service, Roland Crappé, on Portuguese Ceylon and India. The raids were partially unsuccessful, in that Crappé's ship, Øresund (meaning the Sound), caught fire and sank.

== Background ==
In 1611, after the Portuguese captured Kandy and set fire to the city, King Senerat of Kandy urgently dispatched courier, Marchells Michielsz Boschouver, to Europe in hopes of negotiating an alliance-treaty with the Dutch East India Company. Despite his efforts, the mission was unsuccessful and Boschouver ended up in Denmark, where he signed an un-ratified treaty with Christian IV of Denmark. Denmark then sent five vessels and 300 soldiers, led by Ove Gjedde, to Ceylon to fulfill the terms of the treaty. Along with Gjedde, Dutchman and experienced seafarer, Roland Crappé was sent too. Because of his earlier experiences, Crappé was sent to India two months before Gjedde.

== Battle and raids ==
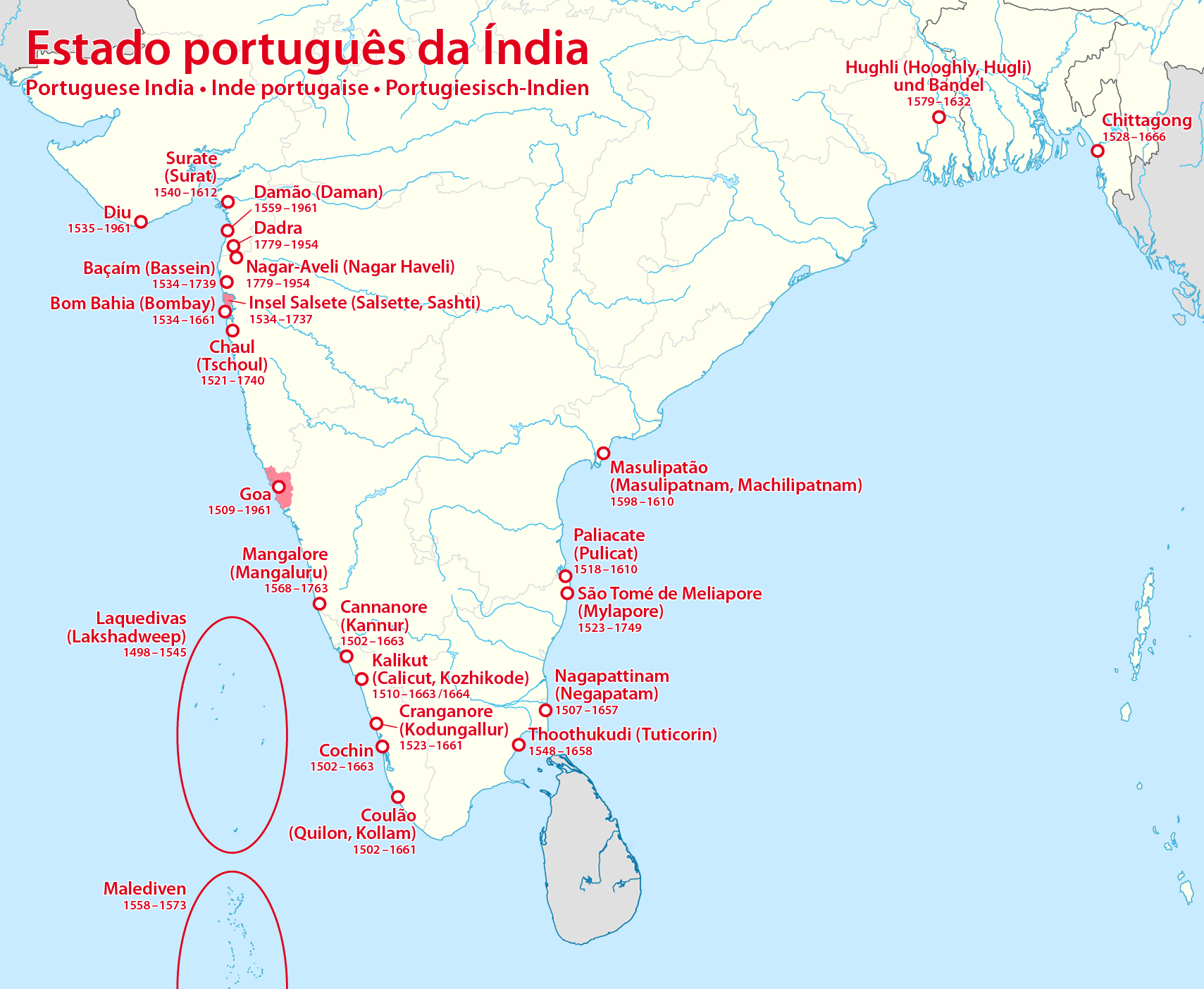
Map of Portuguese India

Crappé arrived on board of Øresund, as the first representative of the Danish expedition, on Ceylon in January 1619. Crappé's task was to prepare for Ove Giedde's arrival. Crappé met with the raja, Senarat of Kandy, and mentioned Boshouwer's mission, which the raja seems to have knowledge about. Senarat encouraged Crappé to attack the Portuguese, which was an encouragement that demanded careful consideration; to conduct privateering against a European Great Power was a dubious affair, which could end in destruction.

Crappé wanted to make a good impression on the raja, and attacked the Portuguese on the Coromandel Coast. He hijacked five Portuguese sampans and attacked Jaffna, Nagapattinam and other coastal Portuguese outposts. Despite Portuguese irritation, they didn't want to politicize the situation. Instead they retaliated by attacking Øresund at Karaikal.

Near the fishing village of Karaikal, seven smaller Portuguese vessels tried to recapture the five sampans. Under fire, Øresund caught fire and sank. Crappé recalls the event:

...I found myself surrounded by some drawn sabers, and they dragged me by the throat through a quarter where I thought they were going to murder us...

Twenty-seven of the ship's crew, including Crappé, were imprisoned. Crappé was brought over to the lifeguard's house to sleep. Next morning he witnessed 4 of his comrades heads on spikes.

== Aftermath ==
Roland Crappé got in contact with a senior official of the local Thanjavur kingdom. And after a month 14 healthy or wounded Dano-Norwegians were rescued out of Portuguese imprisonment. Together with Crappé, the 15 men went out to the city of Thanjavur, and through friends, Crappé managed to get into audience with the king, Raghunatha. Raghunatha got five additional Dano-Norwegians out of Nagapattinam, and fined Portugal for the loss of Øresund.

Raghunatha could see the benefit in forging ties with another European power in the hope of decreasing the influence of the Portuguese in his kingdom. For that reason he allowed the Danes to establish as the first Danish trading post in India at Tranquebar.

== See also ==
- Cattle War – Conflict between Danish India and the Thanjavur Maratha kingdom
- Ove Gjedde – Danish nobleman and Admiral of the Realm
- Portuguese conquest of the Jaffna kingdom – Battle in Sri Lanka (1560–1621)
- Dannemarksnagore
- Conquest of Koneswaram Temple – Destruction and desecration of Koneswaram Temple
