= Cron Printz Christian (DAC ship) =

1699 Danish ship

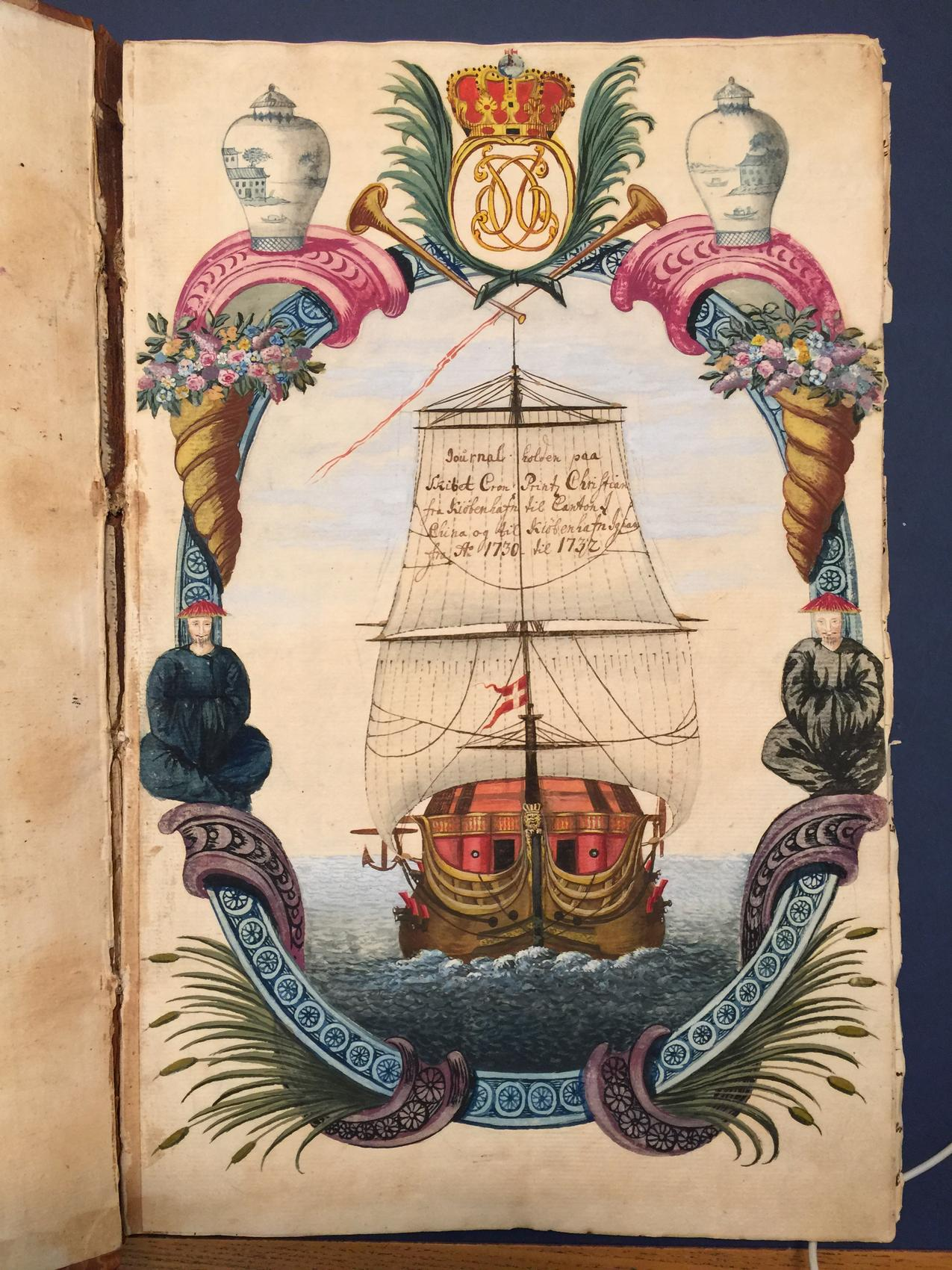
Cronprintz Christian seen on the front page from the ship journal from its 1730-31 voyage to China.

Cron Printz Christian was the first Chinaman of the Danish Asiatic Company. A former Royal Swedish Navy ship of the line, HSMS Warberg, launched at Karlskrona in 1699, she was one of three Swedish naval ships captured by Tordenskiold at Marstrand in 1719 and subsequently included in the Royal Dano-Norwegian Navy as HDMS Kronprinsen af Danmark. In 1730, she was loaned out to the newly established Danish Asiatic Company for its first expedition to Canton.

== Career ==
=== HSMS Warberg, 1699–1719 ===
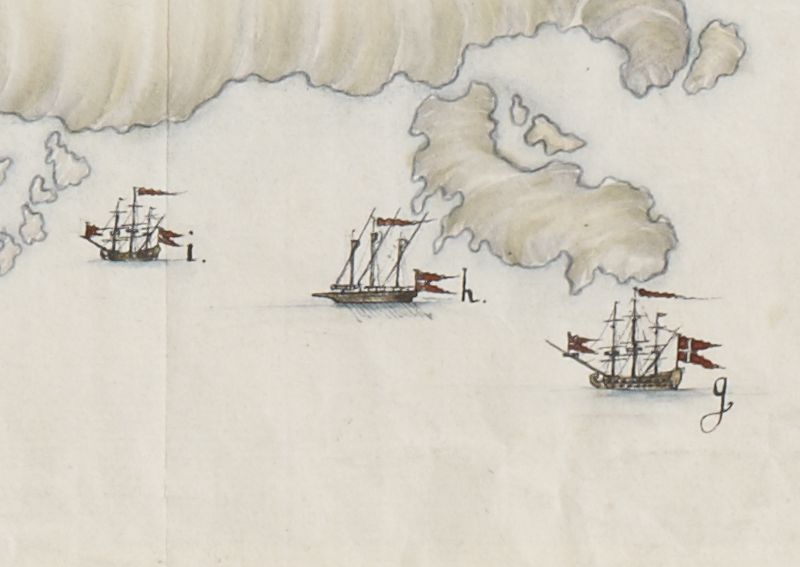
Detail from Danish map. The Swedish frigate Varberg (g), the galley Prins Fredrik av Hessen (h), and the frigate William Galley (i) are all captured by Danish forces and are escorted to safety east of Koön, 1719.

HSMS Warberg was a frigate of the Royal Swedish Navy, launched at Karlskrona in 1699.

During the attack on Marstrand, Varberg was one of three Swedish naval ships captured by Peter Tordenskiold and escorted to safety east of Koön. The two other ships were the galley Prins Fredrik av Hessen and the frigate William Galley.

=== HDMS Kronprinsen af Danmark ===
Warberg was subsequently commissioned by the Royal Danish Navy as Kronprinsen af Danmark.

=== Cron Printz Christian; Canton, 1730–32 ===
Some of Copenhagen's leading merchants responded to the dissolution of the Danish East India Company by creating two trading societies, one for the Indian trade and another one for the new and promising China trade. On 20 April 1730, the two societies were merged to form the Danish Asiatic Company. It was decided to loan out Kronprinsen af Danmark to the interim company for its first expedition to China. The ship was subsequently adapted for her new use as a merchant ship and renamed Cron Printz Christian. Michael Christian Ludvig Ferdinand Tønder, a naval officer who had served under Tordenskiold in the Great Northern War, was selected as captain of the ship. The lack of experience with trade on China presented a challenge to the new company. Peter van Hurk, a Dutchman who had completed four voyages to China with ships of the Dutch East India Company, was appointed as supercargo. Guillielmo de Brouwer, another Dutchman with experience from the Dutch East India Company, was appointed as second captain. Peter Mule was appointed as second supercargo. Joachim Bonasch was appointed as 3rd supercargo. Hans Ølgod was appointed as skibsskriver. Frederik Zimmer was appointed as third mate. Christen Lintrup, who would later be raised to the peerage under the name Lindencrone, started his career in the Danish Asiatic Company as second assistant on the expedition.

Cron Printz Christian was towed out of Copenhagen Harbour on 14 October 1730 and set sails 12 days later. The voyage was off to a bad start when foul weather took her too far north and a leak in the hull made it necessary to call at the Faroe Islands for repairs. In January 1731, Cron Printz Christian called on the Canary Islands. She passed the Cape of Good Hope in May and then continued east to the islands of Amsterdam and St. Paul. She then turned to a northeasterly course, directly towards the Sunda Strait, between Sumatra and Java, where in late June fresh supplies were taken aboard.

On 26 June 1731, Cron Printz Christian called at Macao. A delegation from the ship headed by van Hurk paid a visit to the Portuguese governor. On 27 June, a Chinese vessel escorted the delegation up the Pearl River to Canton to apply for permission from the Hoppo to send Cron Printz Christian up the Pearl River for trade. The permission reached the ship four days later. She was subsequently inspected both by Chinese customs officials and a Mandarin from the fort of Bocca Tigris before continuing up the river to anchorage of Whampoa.

Peter van Hurk and the other company traders rented a Chinese factory outside Canton proper as their headquarters. They spent the next months purchasing more than a thousand crates of tea, 305 stacks of porcelain, 274 pieces of tuttenage metal (zinc oxide) as well as a range of other items. In addition to this came 101 crates acquired as part of the salary of the captains, mates, company traders and other senior crew members. The fact that van Hurk was allowed sixteen crates of goods while Tønder as captain was only allowed three crates testifies to the important role he played on the expedition. Even de Brouwer was with six crates of goods allowed twice as much as Tønder.

The stowing of Cron Printz Christian began in October 1731, On 15 December, she left the anchorage of Whampoa. She reached the Cape of Good Hope after just three weeks where fresh provisions were taken on board. Cron Printz Christian arrived back in Copenhagen on 27 June 1732.

=== DAC service ===
The Danish Asiatic Company purchased the ship in August 1732.

Tranquebar, 1732–34

She departed from Copenhagen in late 1832 bound for Tranquebar. She anchored at the roads of Tranquebar on 4 June 1733. Vendela was already anchored at the roads of Tranquebar when she arrived. They were joined by Grev Laurvig around one month later. It was impossible for the government in Tranquebar to provide goods for three ships at once. Vendela was therefore stowed with the available goods and sent ahead while Kronprinsen af Danmark and Grev Laurvig had to wait for more goods to be acquired. On 13 January 1834, Kronprinsen af Danmark was finally able to embark on her voyage back to Copenhagen. It would take another three weeks for Grev Laurvig to set sail from Tranquebar. Kongen af Danmark was finally able to salute Kronborg Castle on 23 July 1734.

Tranquebar, 1734–35

Kronprinsen af Danmark was captained by Poul Jensen on her next expedition to Tranquebar in 1734. She saluted Kronborg Castle on 24 November 1734. She arrived at Tranquebar on 31 August 1635. She set sail from Tranquebar on 11 January 1736. She saluted Kronborg Castle on 13 July 1736 to mark her return to Danish waters.

Tranquebar, 1737–38

Fridericus Quartus wrecked off Skagen in 1736. Her cargo was subsequently salvaged from the wreck. It was decided to send Kronprinsen af Danmark to Skagen to pick it up and then complete the planned expedition. She was again under the command of Capt. Poul Hensen. saluted Kronborg on 11 January 1737 to mark the beginning of her voyage, picked the cargo up as planned, and arrived at Tranquebar on 27 July 1737. She set sail from Tranquebar on 4 November 1737. She saluted Kronborg Castle on 17 June 1738.

== Fate and legacy ==
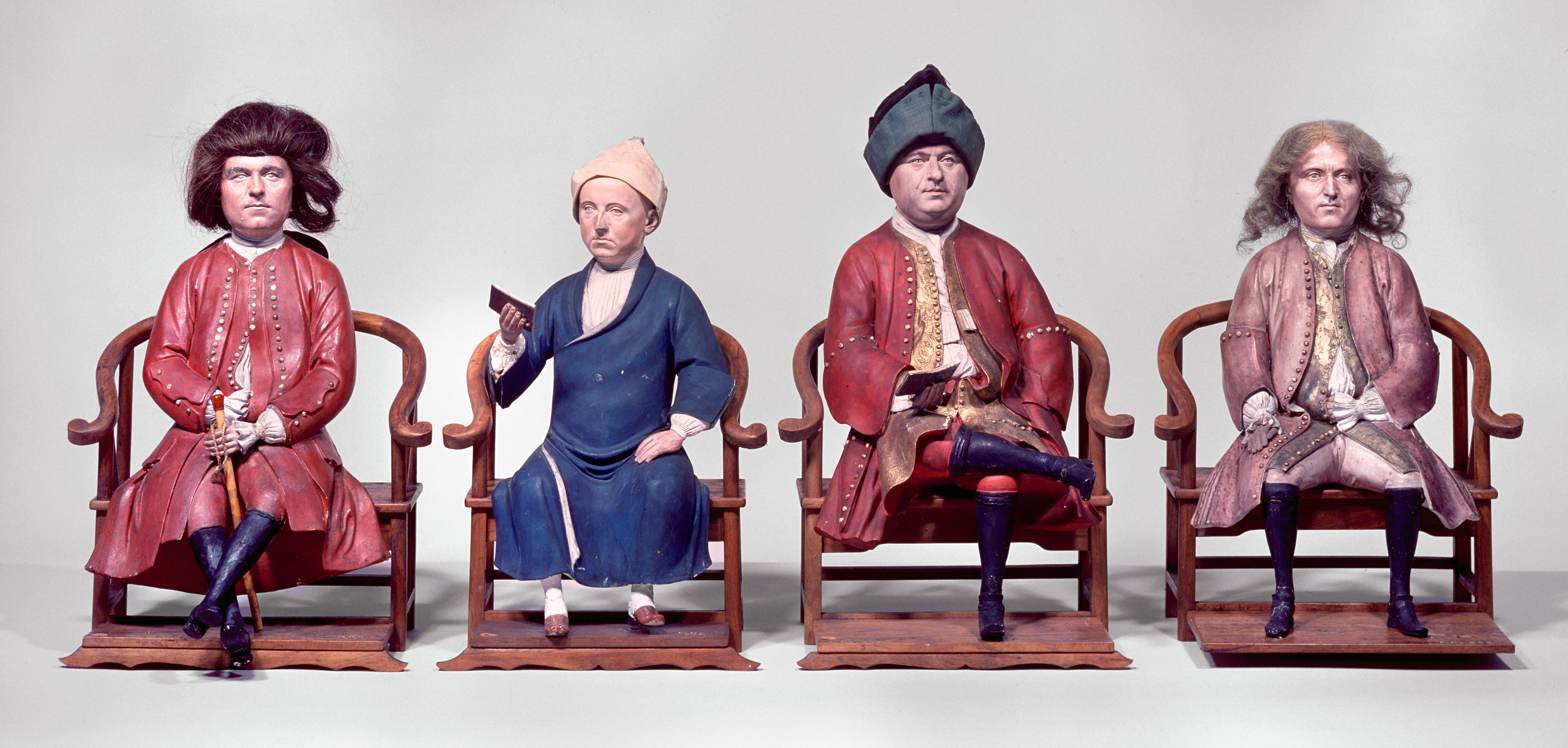
Clay figures created in Canton of crew members of Kronprins Christian in 1731. From left to right: Michael Tønder, Peter van Hurk, Peter Mule..

The ship journals from Cron Printz Christian's 1730–32 voyage are kept in the National Archives of Denmark. Other written accounts of the voyage include Zimmer's tyrmandsoptegnelser fra rejse 1730-1732 and cadet Tobias Wigandt's diary from the expedition.

Captain Michael Tønder, supercargo Peter van Hurk, second supercargo Peter Mule. Third supercargo Joachim Bonasch and third mate Frederik Zimmer were all portrayed in Canton by one of the city's so-called face-makers. Four of these painted clay portrait statuettes are now in the collection of the National Museum of Denmark but loaned out to the Danish Maritime Museum in Helsingør. The one of Frederik Zimmer is privately owned.
