= Roland Crappé =

17th-century Dutch general and governor of Danish India

2nd Governor of Tranquebar
- In office 1621–1636
- Monarch: Christian IV
- Preceded by: Ove Gjedde
- Succeeded by: Bernt Pessart

Personal details
- Born: Unknown Dutch Republic
- Died: 1644 Copenhagen
- Spouse: Unmarried

Military service
- Allegiance: Dutch Republic; Denmark–Norway 1618–1644
- Rank: General
- Battles/wars: Roland Crappé's raids on Portuguese colonies; Siege of Dansborg (1624)

Roland Crappé or Roelant Crappé (Hindi: Reland Crepi; d 13 March 1644) was a Dutch colonial official serving the Dutch and Danish East India Company. He became director general of the Ceylonese (Sri Lankan) department of the Danish East India Company in 1618 and became commander in chief and governor of Tranquebar upon his seventh arrival in the Indies in 1624. During his leadership, new factories and offices were established and Danish trade went exceptionally well. He died in 1644 only a few years after his homecoming to Denmark.

== Early life ==
According to Icelandic Jón Ólafsson, Roland Crappé was born into a poor Dutch family. He would early on go to sea where he acquired his first literacy. He would also make five voyages to India in Dutch service: first as a ship's boy, then as a merchant.

== Early career ==
In March 1616 the Danish East India Company was founded and at approximately the same time Crappé came to Denmark. An expedition was meanwhile prepared to set sail for Sri Lanka to establish a Danish monopoly on the island.

=== Expedition to Sri Lanka ===
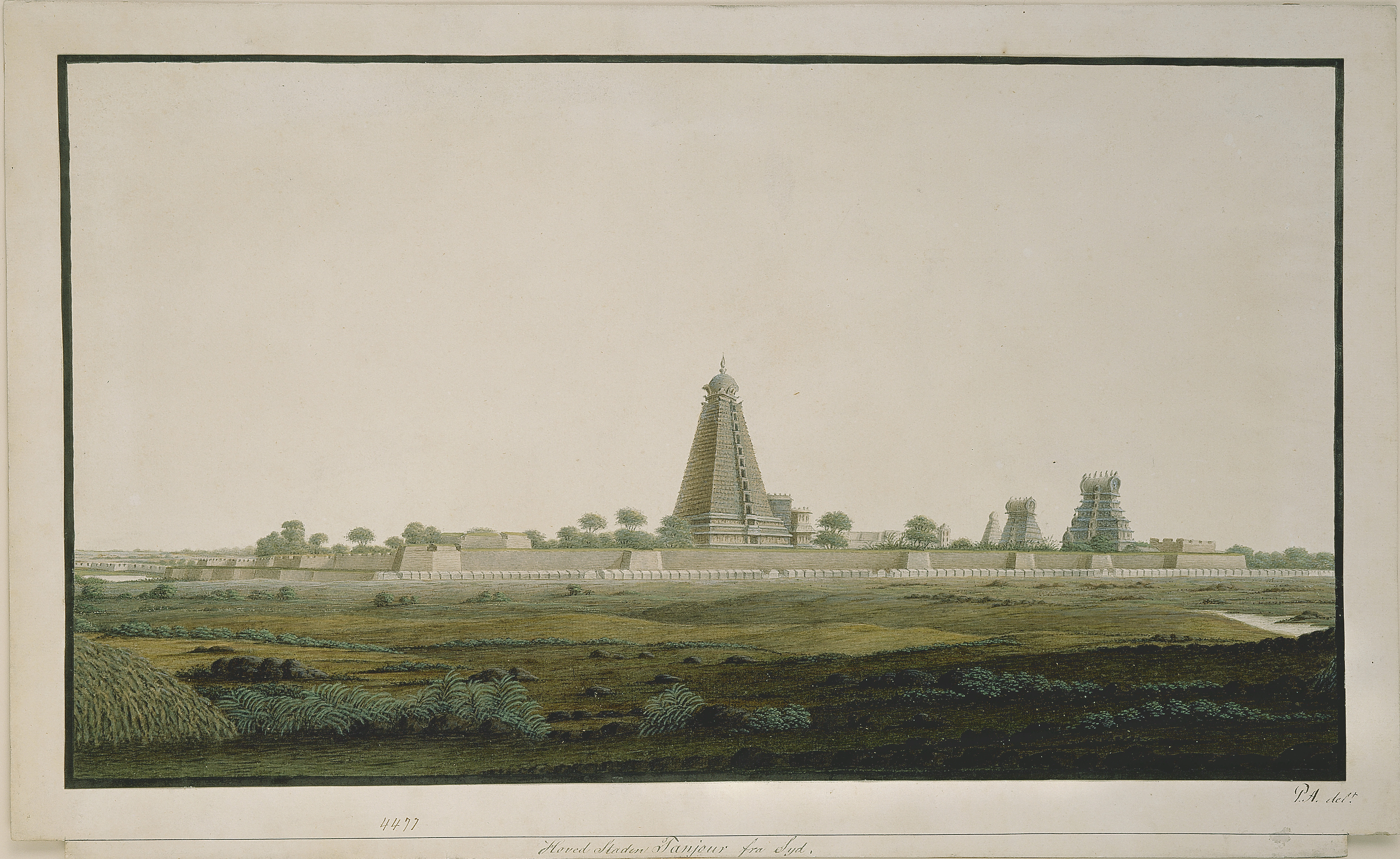
The capital Thanjavur, by later Danish governor Peter Anker

Because of his previous experiences in India, Crappé was appointed director general of a new Ceylonese department of the Danish East India Company and was to leave for Sri Lanka with the vessel Øresund a couple of months before the rest of the Danish expedition to prepare for the arrival of admiral Ove Gjedde.

Crappé arrived with Øresund on the shores of Sri Lanka as the first representatives of the Danish expedition in late January 1619. The king of Kandy, Senarat, demanded that Crappé campaigned against the Portuguese, and hereafter Crappé would sail up the Coromandel Coast to raid Portuguese outposts. However, he would be intercepted off Karaikal and imprisoned by the Portuguese authorities.

Luckily for Crappé, because of his earlier experiences, he had local contacts in the various Indian kingdoms, and he thereby got in contact with a high official of the local kingdom of Thanjavur, who helped rescue Crappé and some other of his crew. Later Crappé and 15 of his men went to the capital of Thanjavur, where Crappé allegedly had friends that could help them. Through his friends, Crappé got an audience with the Nayak of Thanjavur Raghunatha. The Nayak had seen a benefit in bonding with another European power in the hopes of weakening the Portuguese influence in his realm, and he granted the Danes the local fishing village of Tharangambadi, which they quickly renamed Tranquebar (Danish: Trankebar). Crappé recalls the event:

Here, my men, you can see how wonderfully God has helped us precisely because of our information from my good friends in Thanjavur to ask the Regnato Naicguo that the village of Trangenbari – where our office is now located – that the proceeds of this place must now be given to the poor people from Øresund

— Roland Crappé

Crappé would send a man named Jan Peitersen to Sri Lanka to inform admiral Gjedde about the deal. Gjedde arrived in September 1620 and concluded a treaty with the Nayak, which promised the Handover of Tranquebar to the Danes. Despite being signed by Gjedde, the treaty with the Nayak and the subsequent territorial transfer was heavily the good work of Crappé.

At Gjedde's arrival at Tranquebar, tensions began to arise between him and Crappé. Gjedde suspected that Crappé's intentions were in the Dutch, rather than Danish, favour, and when Gjedde left for Copenhagen in early 1621, Crappé was relieved. Crappé though soon followed after and arrived in Denmark in August of the same year.

=== Second expedition and regime ===
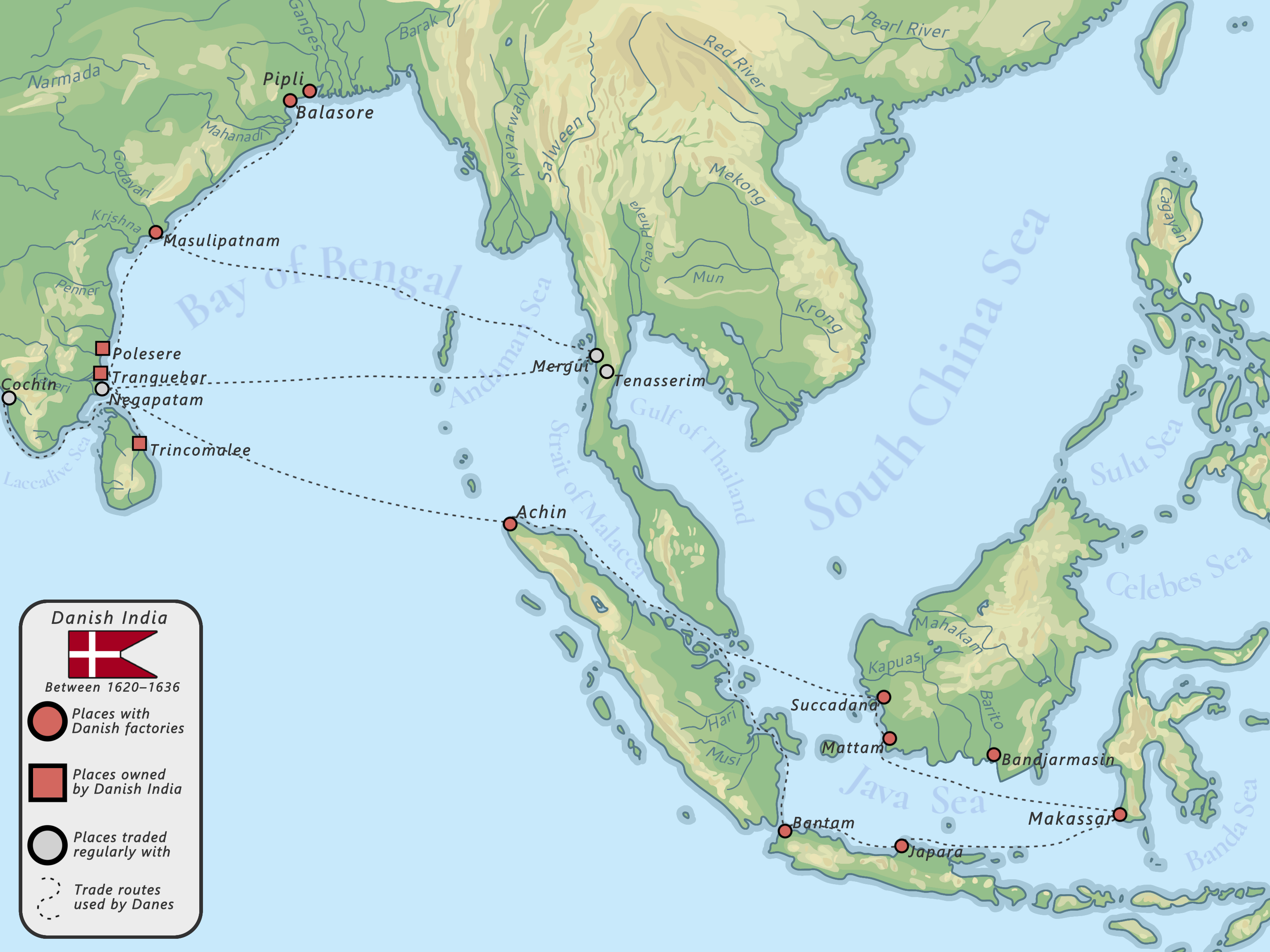
Danish India under Roland Crappé between 1621 and 1636.

Crappé would again set sail for India in 1623 with Perlen, this time being commander in chief of the expedition as well as in India. On 14 March 1624, he arrived on the coast of Tranquebar and relieved the Siege of Dansborg. Crappé would be accepted as commander and he would later assume the title of general.

Crappé would stay in India for the next 13 years. In his reign, he would be an efficient leader, and already a couple of years after his accession he would establish factories in Bengal at Balasore and Pipli, yet he would not be granted favorable commercial terms by the Mughal emperor despite sending a delegation to Agra in 1626. It went better in the Sunda Islands, where Crappé would establish trading posts at Achin, Jepara, Banten, Sukadana, Banjarmasin, and Makassar. These factories and trading posts would be vital for Danish trade, Makassar would even be described as a center for Danish trade by a later Dutch report.

In India, he would establish a factory at the trading hub of Masulipatnam, which was originally an unimportant fishing village, yet in the 17th century, its commercial importance began to grow. Crappé could here trade with Arabian and Persian merchants, who specialized in textiles. Thanks to the royal support of Christian IV of Denmark, the company was able to trade in between the beforementioned trading posts, instead of relying on cargos from Europe.

Despite Crappé's successful attempts at establishing a far-flung string of Danish factories in Asia, the company would suffer huge financial losses, as the Nightingale got wrecked off the Coast of Bengal by a hurricane. The cargo, which had the value of 20,000 Danish rigsdaler, was also lost to the hurricane, and this would be the start of a large decline in trade, which was made evident during his successor, Bernt Pessart's, reign.

On 8 November 1636, Crappé would resign from his post and headed home for Copenhagen on the St. Anna, which he reached a year later.

== Later years ==
Upon arriving in Denmark, Crappé was entangled in a conflict with the company directors over Crappé's accounts. Though he would get support from Christian IV, who announced Crappé to be one of the three company directors in Copenhagen, and Crappé would thereby own a farm nearby. Crappé would die in Copenhagen on 13 March 1643.

== See also ==
- Poul Hansen Korsør – 17th-century Danish merchant and governor of Danish India
- Ove Gjedde – Danish nobleman and Admiral of the Realm
- Peter Anker
- Anders Nielsen (colonist) – 16th-century Danish merchant and colonist

== Bibliography ==
- Wellen, Kathryn (2015). The Danish East India Company's War against the Mughal Empire, 1642-1698 (PDF). Royal Netherlands Institute for Southeast Asian and Caribbean Studies.
- Bredsdorff, Asta (2009). The Trials and Travels of Willem Leyel. Copenhagen: Museum Tusculanum Press. ISBN 9788763530231.
- Bredsdorff, Asta (1999). Søhistoriske Skrifter (PDF) (in Danish). Vol. XXI. Copenhagen: Handels- og Søfartsmuseet Kronborg.
- Knudsen, Karin (2017). "Kolonien Trankebar". Trankebar Foreningen.
- Knudsen, Asgar (2020). "Christian IV drømte om guld og krydderier fra Indien: Sådan blev Tranquebar en dansk koloni". Videnskab.dk.
- Laursen, L. (2022). "Roland Crappé". Lex.dk.
