= Ove Gjedde's Expedition =

1618–1622 Danish expedition to Asia

- Part of the Age of Discovery
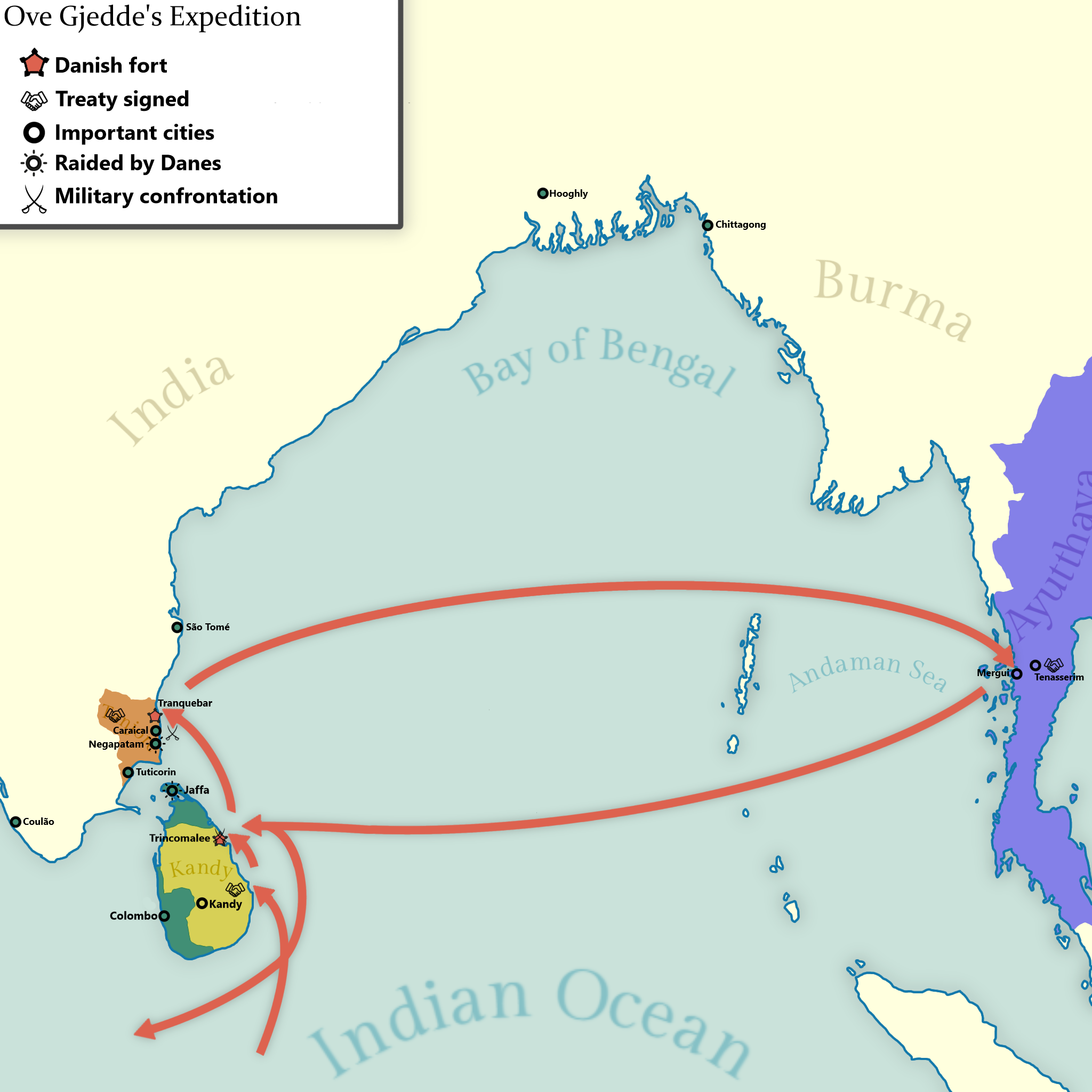
- Native name: Ove Gjeddes ekspedition
- Date: August 16, 1618 – March 4, 1622
- Duration: 3 years, 200 days
- Location: East Indies
- Type: Expedition
- Patrons: Christian IV, Roland Crappé, and others...
- Participants: c. 400
- Deaths: c. 200–240

Ove Gjedde's Expedition (Danish: Ove Gieddes ekspedition) or the Danish Expedition to India of 1618–1622 (Danish: Ostindiske ekspedition af 1618–1622) was the first Danish colonial expedition to the Indian subcontinent and Southeast Asia, reaching Sri Lanka, Thanjavur and Ayutthaya. The expedition was initiated by the newly established Danish East India Company and led by 24-year-old Ove Gjedde. Despite not achieving its original goal of monopolizing Sri Lanka, the expedition still managed to receive control and trading privileges over various coastal towns and cities.

== Background ==
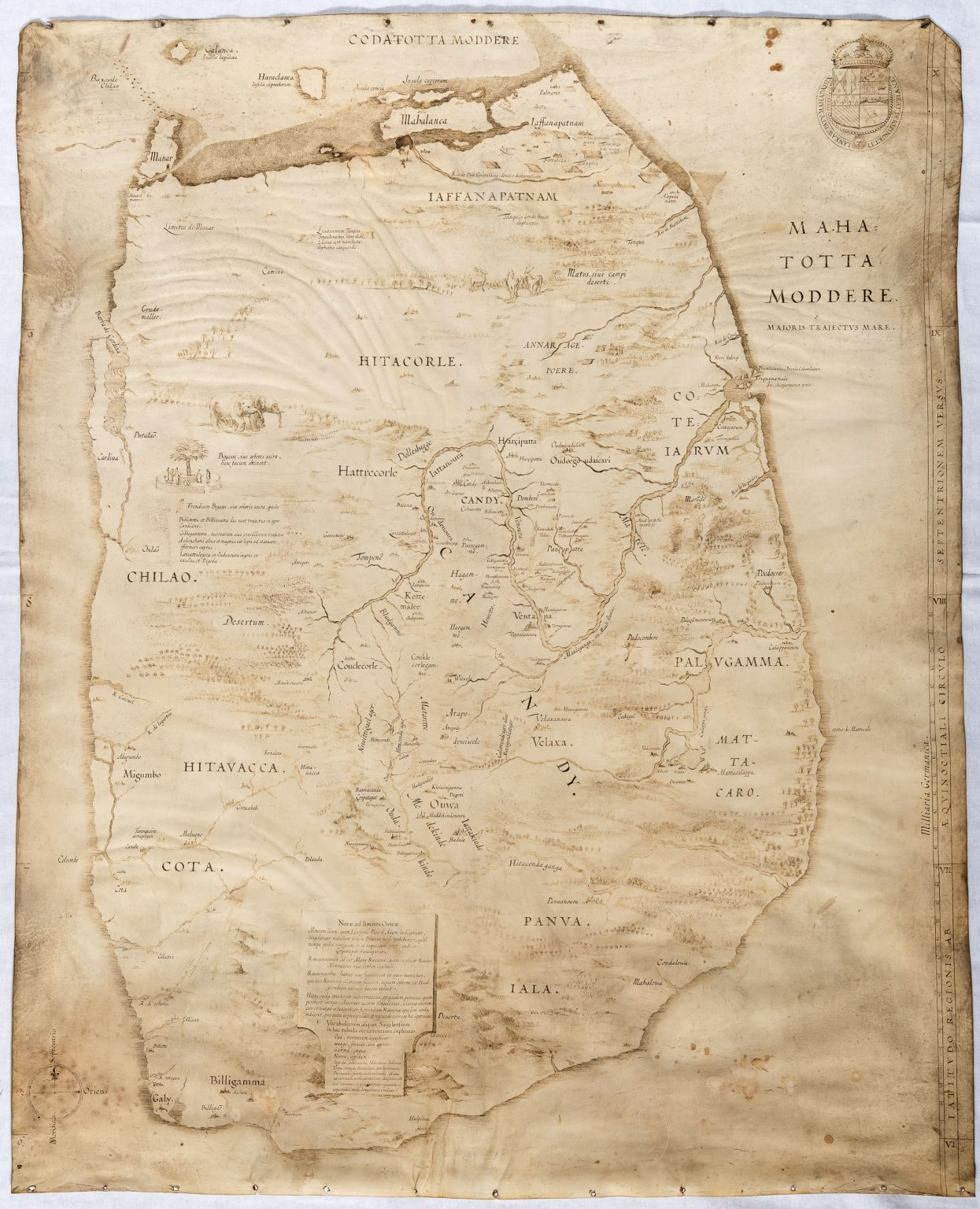
Map of Sri Lanka believed to have been presented to Christian IV by Marchelis Boschouver

In 1616 the Danish East India Company was established with the aim of starting Danish commerce in the East Indies. Originally, the Company's commercial interests lay in the Coromandel Coast, however, when courier for Kandy Marchelis Boschouver arrived in Copenhagen, he managed to convince the Company's shareholders, including Christian IV of Denmark, to invest in a monopoly on Sri Lanka. Subsequently, an expedition led by 24-year-old Ove Gjedde would be initiated.

=== Preparations ===
Gjedde would personally lead the flagship Elephanten, while Boschouver would be on board on the David. Additionally, the two warships the Christian and Kiobenhavn, (Note: Alternatively spelled Kiøbenhaffn) which were Swedish prizes from the Kalmar War, would also be attached to the fleet. As vanguard, experienced Dutchman Roland Crappé would sail for Sri Lanka a couple of months before the rest of the expeditionary fleet.

== Expedition ==
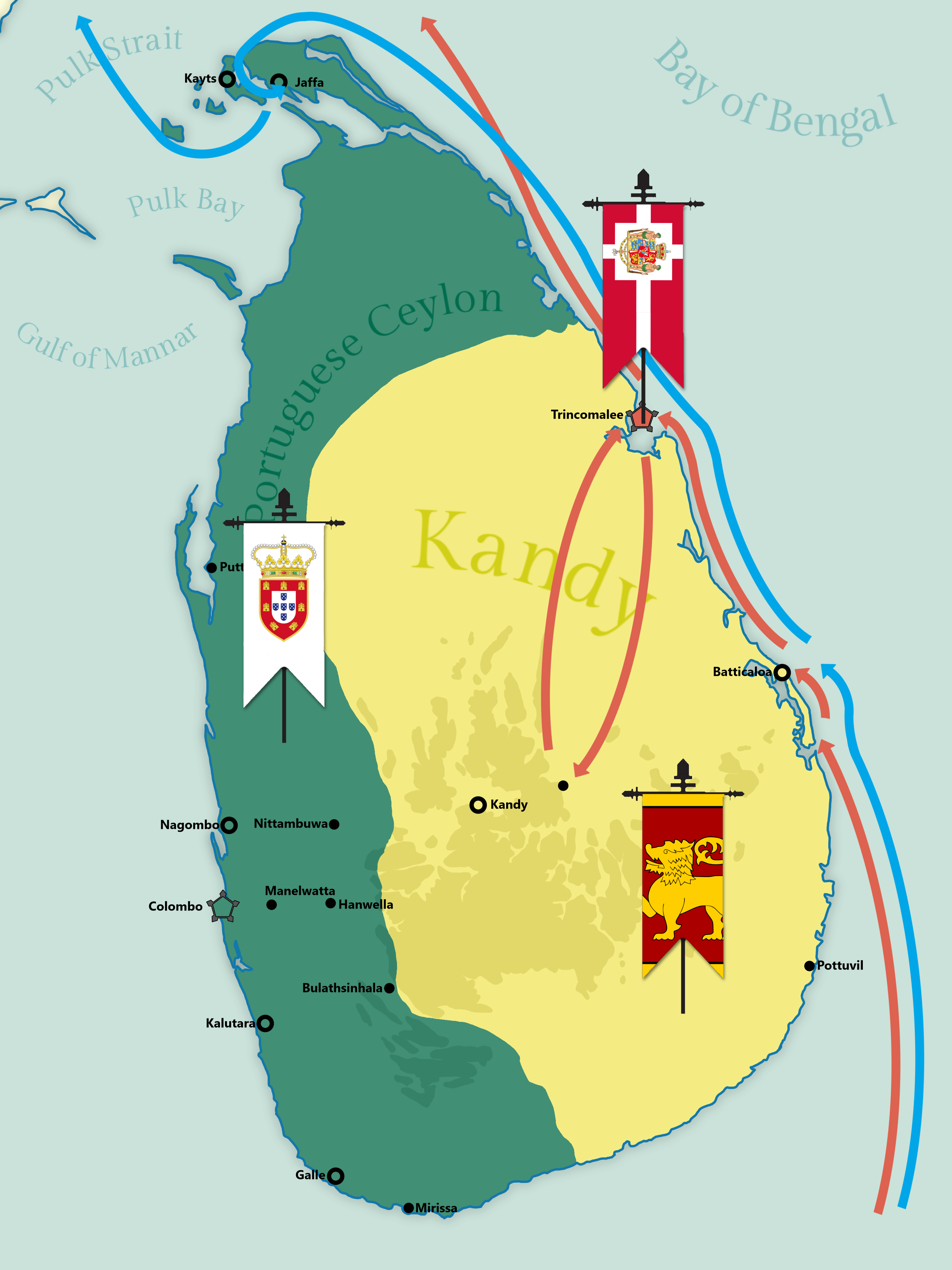
Danish routes of their expedition in Sri Lanka. Roland Crappé's navigations are shown in blue, while Ove Gjedde's are shown in red.

The main expedition took sail in November 1618, however, the journey to India became very difficult, and they only reached Sri Lanka in 1620. Scurvy killed at least half of the crew before they reached the Cape of Good Hope in July 1619 and the expedition had trouble with navigation, and as no European navigational map was brought on to the expedition. Furthermore, the majority of the crews were Dutchmen, who were discontent with the inexperienced Danish leadership. At one point, Boschouver tried to sail away, however, he got caught and died before the expedition reached Sri Lanka.

=== Arrival of the Øresund in Sri Lanka ===
As a vanguard, Crappé arrived with the Øresund in Sri Lanka in late 1619 to prepare for the arrival of Gjedde. The King of Kandy, Senarat, ordered Crappé to wage war against the Portuguese, which culminated in a confrontation off Karaikal. Seven smaller Portuguese frigates sought to regain some vessels Øresund had seized, and in the initial battle, she caught fire and sank. Subsequently, Crappé and some of his men would be imprisoned by the Portuguese authorities, while many other Danes would be beheaded. However, Crappé succeeded in getting in contact with an official from the local Thanjavurian kingdom, and together Crappé and 14 of his men managed to escape the imprisonment. The men now traveled to Thanjavur, where, through local friends, Crappé could get in an audience with the Nayak Raghunatha. After negotiations, the Nayak promised Crappé the small fishing village of Tharangambadi to the Danes, however, a treaty confirming the matter was first issued in 1620.

=== Arrival of Ove Gjedde in Sri Lanka ===
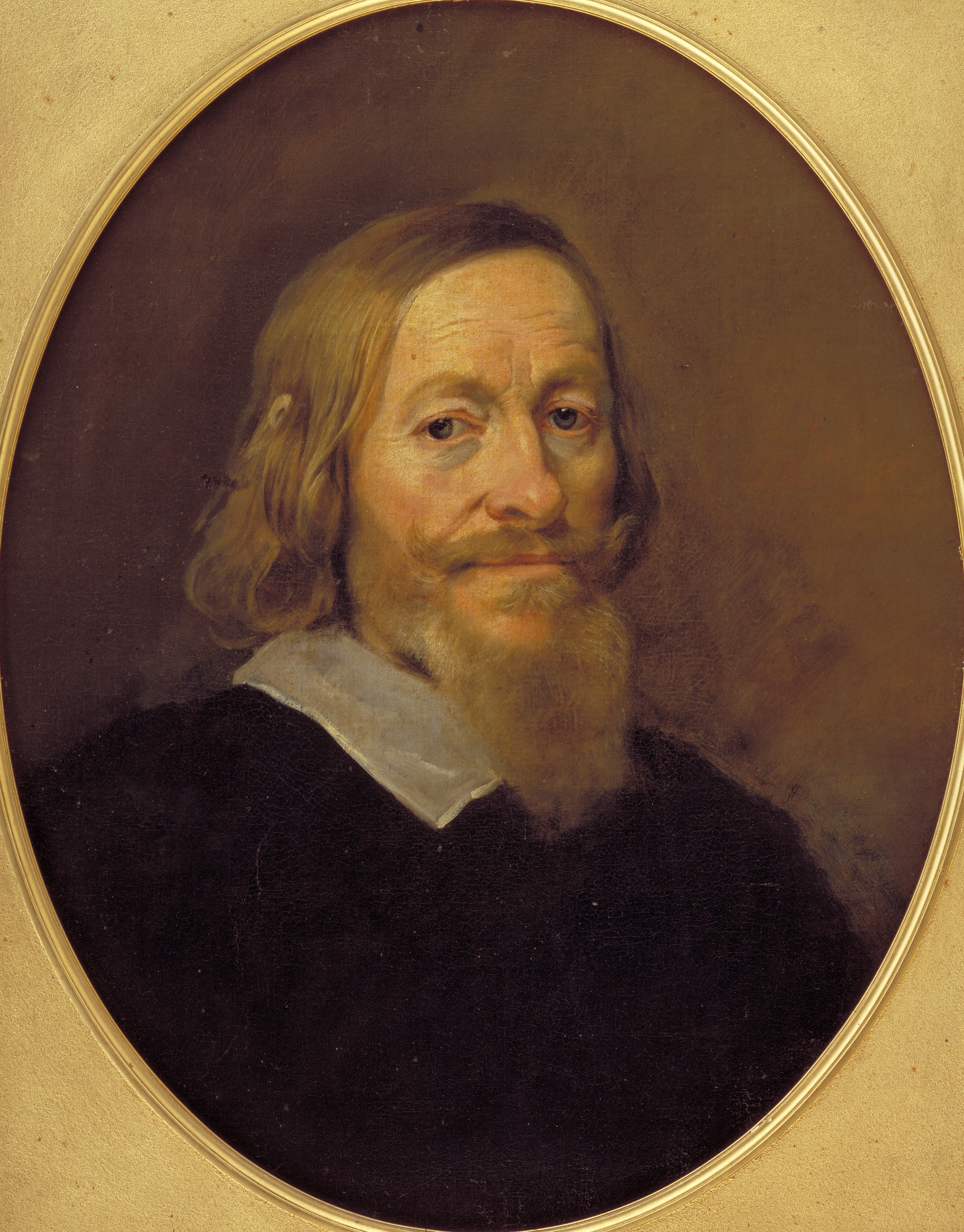
Painting of Ove Gjedde by Karel van Mander III (c. 1630). From the National Gallery of Denmark.

Ove Gjedde with the Elephanten would first anchor at Panama near Batticaloa, Sri Lanka on 18 May 1620, while David and Kiobenhavn would follow on May 24. While meeting the King, Gjedde was informed that Kandy had established peace with the Portuguese three years prior, and therefore no longer felt Danish assistance necessary. However, the Sinhalese still sought to investigate the Danes in case they were able to drive out the Portuguese from the island. Subsequently, Gjedde would sail north to Trincomalee where he would, on 24 June, start negotiations with the Kings's envoys. The Danish expedition occupied the Koneswaram Temple in Trincomalee. In August 1617, the Kandyans concluded a peace treaty with the Portuguese. As a result of the changed circumstances, the negotiations did not bear fruit, and Gjedde therefore found it necessary to meet with the Kandyan monarch personally. On 16 August, Gjedde reached Venthanen (modern-day Mahiyangana) 44 kilometres (27 mi) east of Kandy, where a meeting with Senerat took place. After shifting attitudes and intense negotiations, the Kandyan king signed a treaty of alliance with the Danes, with Denmark–Norway receiving the port of Trincomalee, with Senarat sending 60 men to help them build fortifications. Additionally, the Danes were granted generous commercial privileges and were free to introduce Christianity to Trincomalee. After signing the treaty, Gjedde went to Trincomalee, left some Danes, including Erik Grubbe, and sailed to Thanjavur where he had been informed that Roland Crappé operated.

=== Gjedde at Thanjavur ===
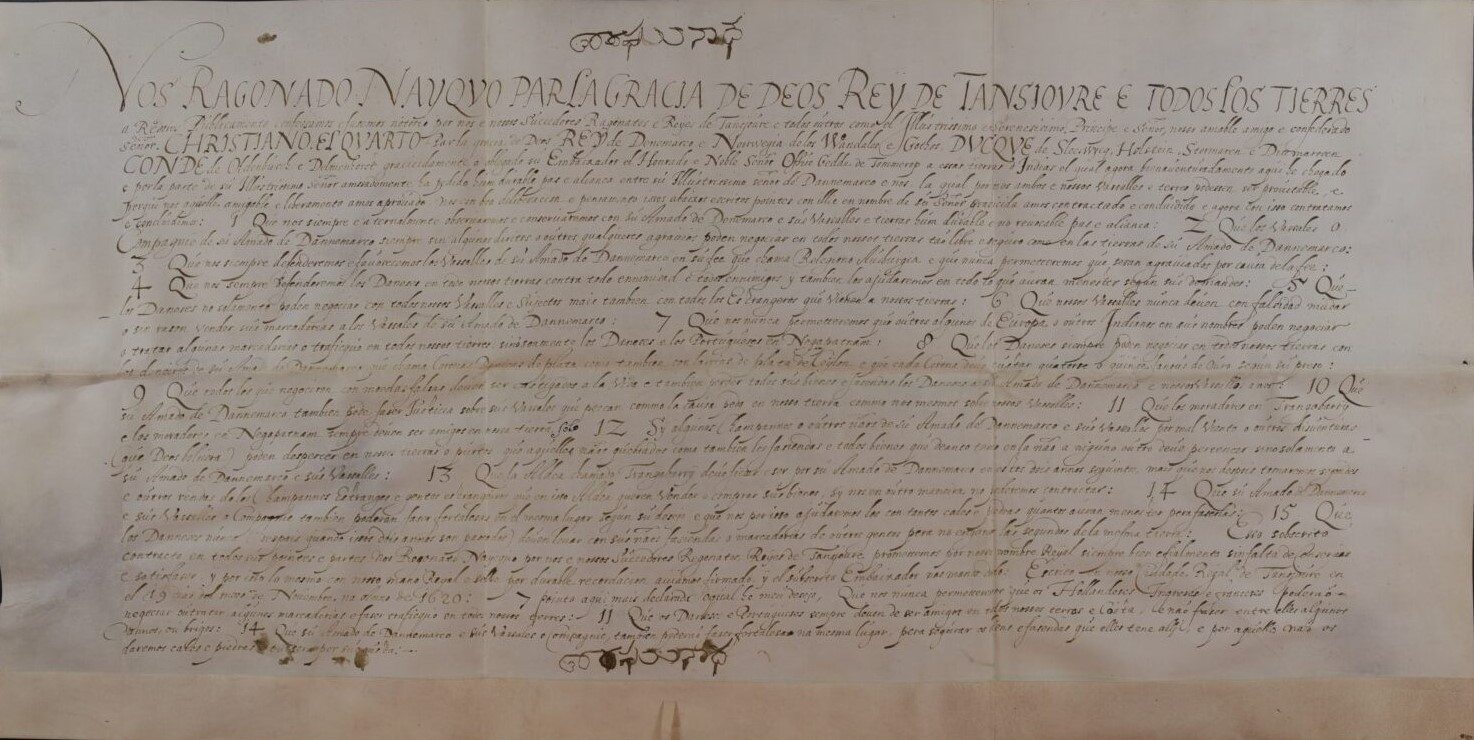
The Tranquebar Treaty of 1620.

Gjedde arrived at Tranquebar on 13 September 1620 and sent word to Crappé, who was at Thanjavur city, to secure the deal with Nayak Raghunatha. Weeks followed with negotiations and mutual presents, which culminated on 19 November with the signing of the treaty. Tranquebar was ceded to Denmark for two years, and the Danes were allowed to fortify the village.

=== Voyage to Siam ===
In the following year, Crappé with the Kiobenhavn headed across the Bay of Bengal to Mergui, Ayutthaya Kingdom. The Danes were warmly welcomed, as Mergui was an important Siamese trading post. The voyage proved to be a great profit for the Danes as they could load their ships with pepper. With this load, Gjedde left for Copenhagen on 13 February 1621. On his home voyage, Gjedde visited Trincomalee and saw that there had been no progress made on the fortress since he left. Gjedde continued his voyage and reached Copenhagen on 4 March 1622.

== Aftermath ==
Gjedde partially completed his mission and returned with a reasonable cargo, enough to convince the shareholders to continue the enterprise. It must also be admitted that Gjedde could hardly achieve such without the experienced Roland Crappé. Gjedde's fortress of Dansborg would become a monument of his expedition and still stands today.

== Works cited ==
- Ramerini, Marco (2020). "Trincomalee: The arrival of the Danes, the Dutch and the construction of the Portuguese Fort". Colonial Voyage. Archived from the original on 23 September 2020.
- Lauring, Kåre (2017). Marchells Michielsz Boschouver — imperlebygger eller svindler (in Danish). M/S Museet for Søfarts årbog.
- Stow, Randolph (1979). Denmark in the Indian Ocean, 1616-1845 An Introduction. University of Wollongong Research Online.
- Rindom, Jan (1995). Ostindisk Kompagni 1616-50 [East Indian Company 1616-50] (PDF) (in Danish). Copenhagen: Det Kongelige Bibliotek.
- Bredsdorff, Asta (2009). The Trials and Travels of Willem Leyel. Copenhagen: Museum Tusculanum Press. ISBN 9788763530231.
