= Grev Laurvig =

18th century Danish ship

Grev Laurvig was an East Indiaman of the Danish East India Company. In 1732, she was sold to the Danish Asiatic Company.

== Career ==
=== Origins ===
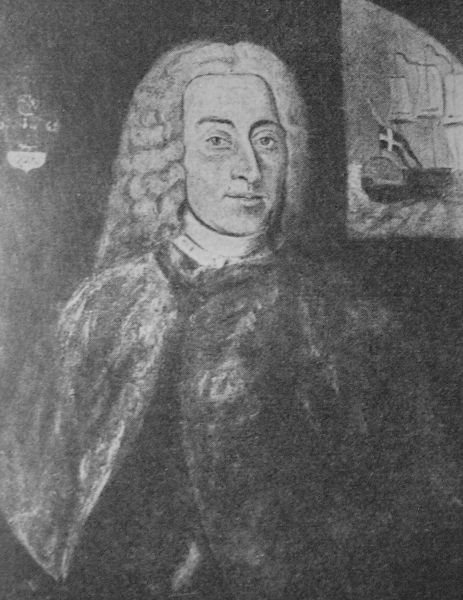
Caspar von Wessel.

The origins of the ship remain unknown. During the Great Northern War, in 1715, under the command of Caspar von Wessel, she was used as a privateering vessel. In the same year, she grounded at Læsø. She had a complement of 58 men and an armament of 18 guns.

=== DOC service, C. 1720–1729 ===
She was later acquired by the Danish East India Company (dOC). She completed five expeditions to India for the company in 1720–22, 1722–24, 1725–27 and 1727–29.

She was sent to the Nicobar Islands in 1723, anchoring at Nancory Island for a few months. The captain and 22 crew members died from disease in the unhealthy climate. Former governor Morten Mortensen Færoe returned to Copenhagen onboard the ship in 1724.

Former governor Christian Ulrich von Nissen returned to Denmark with the ship in 1726 (departure from Tranquebar: 22 October).

She was under the command of captain Anders Mogensen Brun on the last of the five expeditions, returning to Copenhagen in 1729.

=== DAC service ===
The Danish East India Company ceased operations in 1729. On 4 August 1732, she was sold to the new Danish Asiatic Company. Three other DOC ships—Vendela,Kronprinsen af Danmark and Fridericus Quartus—were also sold to the Danish Asiatic Company. With a price of just 4,000 rigsdaler, Grev Laurvig was considerably cheaper than the three other ships, which were sold for 6,000–7,500 rigsdaler.

1732–1735

Grev Laurvig sailed from Copenhagen in late 1732, bound for Tranquebar. She carried a cargo with a total value of 70,000 rigsdaler, consisting mostly of silver (66,697 rigsdaler). She arrived at Tranquebar on 11 July 1733.

Rolluf Olsen Kierulff served as understyrmand on the outbound voyage. Prior to the ship's departure from Tranquebar he was promoted to overstyrmand, After the death of the captain, he took over the command of the ship.

Grev Laurvig sailed from Tranquebar on 4 February 1734, bound for Copenhagen. She saluted Kronborg Castle on 15 February 1735, marking her safe return to Danish waters. The DAC's share of the return cargo was sold at auction for 88,939 rigsdaler.
