= Vendela (DAC ship) =

18th-century Danish ship

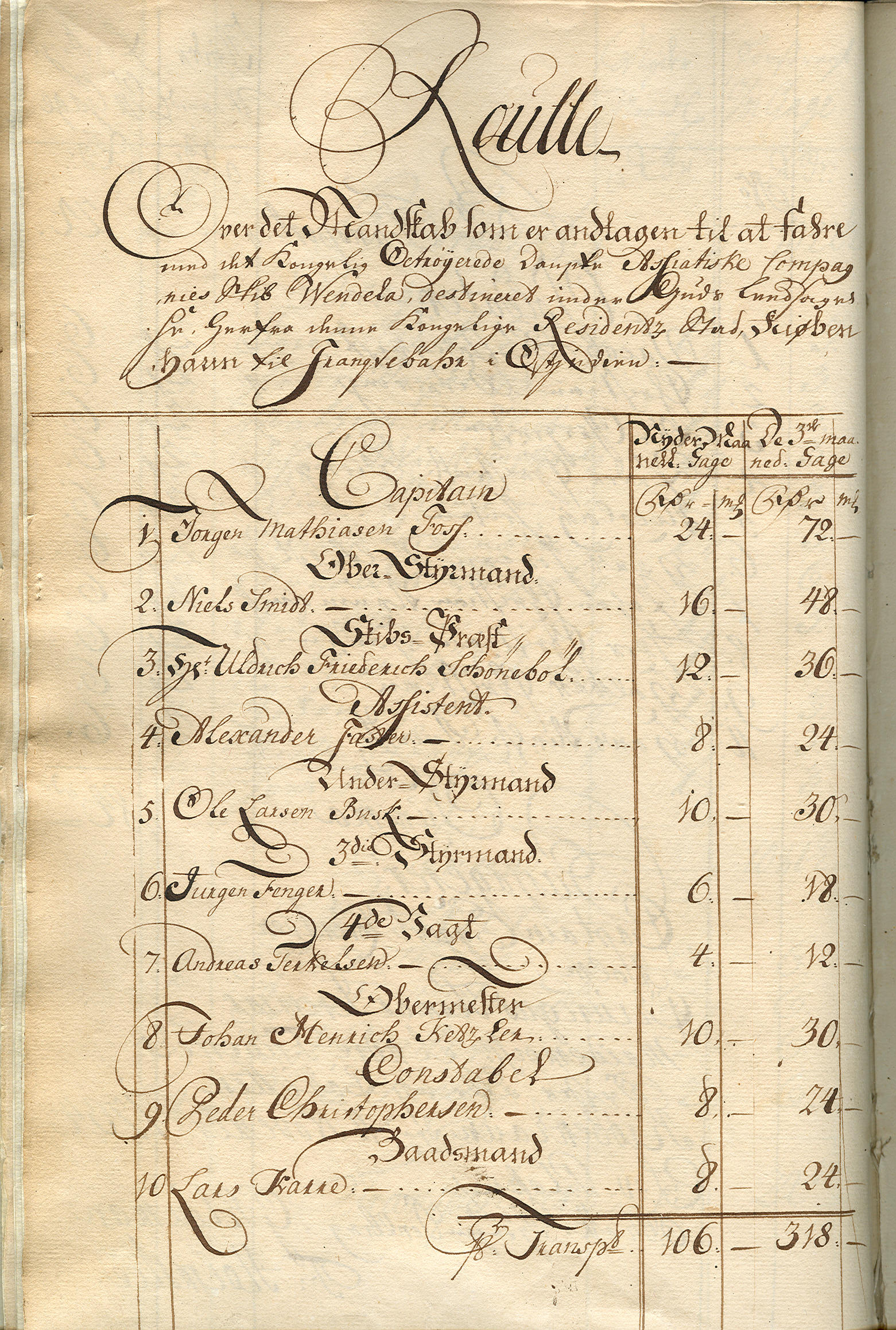
From Vendela's roll book, 1831

Vendela (also spelled Wendela) was an East Indiaman of the Danish East India Company. In 1732, she was sold to the Danish Asiatic Company.

== Career ==
The origins belonged to the Danish East India Company. After the Danish East India Company was discontinued in 1729, she was put at the disposal of the interin Ostindiske Societet (mater merged with the Kinesiske Societet as the Danish Asiatic Company).

She was sent to Tranquebar in 1731. She was under the command of captain Jørgen Mathisen Foss (c. 1780 – 1838). She departed from Tranquebar on 3 November 1733, bound for Copenhagen. Former governor of Danish India Diderich Miihlenfort returned to Copenhagen on board the ship.

In 1732, together with three other DEIC ships, she was sold to the new Danish Asiatic Company. With a price of 6,000 Danish rigsdaler , she was fifty percent more expensive than the cheapest of the four ships, Grev Laurvig, while the two other ships, Kronprinsen af Danmark and Fridericus Quartus, at 7,000 rigsdaler and 7,500 rigsdaler, were slightly more expensive.

Capt. Jørgen Mathisen Foss sailed from Copenhagen on 10 November 1735, bound for Tranquebar. The ship carried a cargo with a total value of 110,000 Danish rigsdaler of which 94 04% (103,813 rigsdaler) was silver. She arrived at Tranquebar on 10 April 1736.

She departed from Tranquebar on 13 October 1736. Her return cargo consisted mostly of black peber. She saluted Kronborg Castle on 7 June 1737, marking her safe return to Danish waters. The DAC's share of the cargo was sold at auction for 167.042 rigsdaler. The allowance of the captain and the other senior crew members was sold for 11.419 rigsdaler.

== Fate ==
Vendela embarked on a new expedition to Tranquebar in November 1737. During a storm on the night between 29 and 30 December (18 and 19 December old time), she wrecked off Heilinabretta, on the east side of Fetlar, Shetland Islands. All crew members died. 17 drifted ashore and one was identified sitting on an inaccessible reef. Only part of the cargo was salvaged. 32 silver bars and 12 bags with coins were returned to Copenhagen. 5/12 of the salvaged cargo went to the locals' salvage claim.

On 10 January 1738, Wreckman William Irvine informed Earl George Douglas Morton that the remains of a wreck had been found. A Danish book indicated the provenance of the ship. Local authorities concluded that ”she ha[d] sunk in a very barbarous place”.
