= List of shipwrecks in 1750 =

The List of shipwrecks in 1750 includes some ships sunk, wrecked or otherwise lost during 1750.

table of contents
1750
Jan	Feb	Mar	Apr
May	Jun	Jul	Aug
Sep	Oct	Nov	Dec
Unknown date

== March ==
1750 did not begin on 1 January!^{[Note 1]}

=== 27 March ===
List of shipwrecks: 27 March 1750
Ship	State	Description
Duke of Cumberland	Great Britain	The ship was lost on the Acklin Keys. Her crew were rescued. she was on a voyage from Jamaica to London.

== April ==
=== 22 April ===
List of shipwrecks: 22 April 1750
Ship	State	Description
Friendship	Great Britain	The ship was lost at St. Lucar, Spain. She was on a voyage from London to Málaga, Spain.

=== Unknown date ===
List of shipwrecks: Unknown date 1750
Ship	State	Description
Mary	(Kingdom of Great Britain) Jersey	The ship was lost on the Irish coast. She was on a voyage from Jersey to Newfoundland, British America.
Redbridge	Great Britain	The ship was driven ashore at Gosport, Hampshire, before 10 April.
St. Jacques	France	The ship was destroyed by fire in the Gironde estuary.

== May ==
=== Unknown date ===
List of shipwrecks: Unknown date 1750
Ship	State	Description
Castor	Great Britain	The ship capsized in the River Thames before 4 May. She was on a voyage from London to Cádiz, Spain.
Duke of Cumberland	Great Britain	The East Indiaman was lost in the Atlantic Ocean off the Cape Verde Islands before 22 May. Her crew were rescued. She was on a voyage from London to Fort St. David, Madras, India.
Prosperous Anne	Great Britain	The ship was lost near Peniche, Portugal, before 29 May with the loss of all but one of her crew. She was on a voyage from King's Lynn, Norfolk, to Málaga, Spain.

== June ==
=== 15 June ===
List of shipwrecks: 15 June 1750
Ship	State	Description
Express	Great Britain	The ship was run down and sunk in the Bay of Biscay. Her crew were rescued. She was on a voyage from London to a Turkish port.

== July ==
=== 21 July ===
List of shipwrecks: 21 July 1750
Ship	State	Description
Devonshire	Great Britain	The ship was captured by the Spanish and taken into Port Royal, Jamaica, where she was destroyed.
Ranger	Great Britain	The ship was captured by the Spanish and taken in to Port Royal, Jamaica, where she was destroyed.

== August ==
=== 15 August ===
List of shipwrecks: 15 August 1750
Ship	State	Description
Elephant	(Denmark) Danish Asiatic Company	The ship was lost in "Mosele Bay", near the Cape of Good Hope. There were 35 survivors; they were rescued by Onwerkirk (Dutch Republic). Elephant was on a voyage from Tranquebar, India, to Copenhagen.

=== 18 August ===
List of shipwrecks: 18 August 1750
Ship	State	Description
El Salvador	Spain	The ship was wrecked in Topsail Inlet, North Carolina, British America, with the loss of all but four of her crew.
Nuestra Sigñora de Solidad	Spain	The full-rigged ship was wrecked in the Drum Inlet, North Carolina. Her crew survived.

=== Unknown date ===
List of shipwrecks: Unknown date 1750
Ship	State	Description
Friendship	Ireland	The ship was driven ashore in the River Corrib. She was on a voyage from a Norwegian port to Gallway.
Hopewell	Great Britain	The ship was lost near Rota, Cádiz, Spain, before 28 August. Her crew were rescued. She was on a voyage from Rye, Sussex, to Cádiz.
Speedwell	Great Britain	The ship was driven ashore and wrecked on the Isle of Wight before 10 August. She was on a voyage from Seville, Spain, to London.
St. Lawrence	Great Britain	The ship was driven ashore on the Isle of Wight before 10 August. She was on a voyage from "Croswick" to Gottenburg, Sweden.

== September ==
=== 2 September ===
List of shipwrecks: 2 September 1750
Ship	State	Description
Orignal	Kingdom of France	The Saint-Laurent-class ship of the line broke in two on being launched at Quebec City, New France.

=== 5 September ===
List of shipwrecks: 5 September 1750
Ship	State	Description
La Galga	Spanish Navy	The galleon was driven ashore in a hurricane and was wrecked on the coast of Assateague Island, Maryland, British America.

=== Unknown date ===
List of shipwrecks: Unknown date 1750
Ship	State	Description
Duke of Beaufort	Great Britain	The ship was driven ashore near Dunkirk, France, before 11 September. She was on a voyage from Saint Petersburg, Russia, to Bristol, Gloucestershire.
George	Great Britain	The ship sprang a leak and put into Padstow, Cornwall, where she sank. She was on a voyage from Biddiford, Devon, to London.
Young Brewer	Dutch Republic	The ship was lost on the Scroby Sands, in the North Sea off the coast of Norfolk, Great Britain, before 11 September. Her crew were rescued. She was on a voyage from Hamburg to Faro, Portugal.

== October ==
=== 30 October ===
List of shipwrecks: 30 October 1750
Ship	State	Description
Vencador	Spanish Navy	The Africa-class ship of the line was destroyed by fire.

=== Unknown date ===
List of shipwrecks: Unknown date 1750
Ship	State	Description
Dolphin	Denmark	The ship was deliberately run down and sunk by a Moroccan vessel before 19 October and sank with the loss of all hands. She was on a voyage from Hamburg to Cádiz, Spain.
Dragon	Great Britain	The ship was destroyed by fire off Flamborough Head, Yorkshire, before 26 October. Her crew were rescued. She was on a voyage from Saint Petersburg, Russia, to London.
Hope	Great Britain	The ship was driven ashore near Boston, Lincolnshire, before 16 October. She was on a voyage from London to a port in North Holland, Dutch Republic.
Mary-Anne	Great Britain	The ship foundered,. Her crew were rescued by Orford (Great Britain). Mary-Anne was on a voyage from Cádiz, Spain, to Havre de Grâce, France.

== November ==
=== 26 November ===
List of shipwrecks: 26 November 1750
Ship	State	Description
Charm	Great Britain	The ship was lost on the Barbary Coast. Her crew were rescued by Penelope (Great Britain). Charm was on a voyage from Rotterdam, South Holland, Dutch Republic to an African port.

=== 30 November ===
List of shipwrecks: 30 November 1750
Ship	State	Description
Joseph and Mary	Great Britain	The ship ran aground off Bembridge, Isle of Wight. She was on a voyage from Saltash, Cornwall, to London

=== Unknown date ===
List of shipwrecks: Unknown date 1750
Ship	State	Description
Anne	Sweden	The ship was lost on the Cork Sand, in the North Sea off the coast of Essex, Great Britain, before 9 November. Her crew were rescued by HMS Amazon ( (Kingdom of Great Britain) Royal Navy).
Cornelius	Portugal	The ship was driven ashore near Caminha before 27 November. She was on a voyage from Riga, Russia, and Memel, Prussia, to Porto.
Friends Goodwill	Ireland	The ship sank near Chichester, Sussex, before 23 November. She was on a voyage from Dublin to Dunkirk, France.

== December ==
=== 4 December ===
List of shipwrecks: 4 December 1750
Ship	State	Description
Providence	Great Britain	The ship was driven ashore and wrecked at Arvert, France, with the loss of one life. She was on a voyage from Newhaven, Sussex, to Lisbon, Portugal.

=== 28 December ===
List of shipwrecks: 28 December 1750
Ship	State	Description
James	Great Britain	The sloop was driven ashore in Loch Indaal. She was on a voyage from Galloway, Ayrshire, to Dublin, Ireland.
Holland	Great Britain	The ship was lost near Launceston, Cornwall, before 11 December with the loss of all hands. She was on a voyage from London to Bristol, Gloucestershire.
Neptune	Great Britain	The ship was driven ashore near Seaforth, Lancashire, before 4 December. She was on a voyage from Seville, Spain, to London.
Norwich Merchant	Great Britain	The ship was driven ashore near Rye, Sussex, before 4 December. She was on a voyage from Antigua to London.

== January ==
=== 4 January ===
List of shipwrecks: 4 January 1750
Ship	State	Description
Samuel and Elizabeth	Great Britain	The ship was lost on the coast of Spain. She was on a voyage from London to Málaga, Spain and Marseille, France

=== 10 January ===
List of shipwrecks: 10 January 1750
Ship	State	Description
Joshua	Great Britain	The ship was driven ashore and wrecked on "Cirella Island".

=== 14 January ===
List of shipwrecks: 14 January 1750
Ship	State	Description
Young Fisher	Dutch Republic	The ship foundered. Her crew were rescued by William & Thomas (Great Britain). Young Fisher was on a voyage from "Georgenti" to Lisbon, Portugal.

=== 17 January ===
List of shipwrecks: 17 January 1750
Ship	State	Description
Durham	Great Britain	The ship foundered in the Irish Sea off Belfast, County Down. She was on a voyage from Philadelphia, Pennsylvania, British America, to Belfast.
Grace	Great Britain	The ship foundered in the Irish Sea off Belfast. She was on a voyage from New York to Belfast.
Great Molly	Great Britain	The ship foundered in the Irish Sea off Belfast. She was on a voyage from Virginia, British America, to Glasgow, Renfrewshire.
Oxford	Great Britain	The ship foundered in the Irish Sea off Holyhead, Anglesey. She was on a voyage from Virginia to Liverpool, Lancashire.

=== 18 January ===
List of shipwrecks: 18 January 1750
Ship	State	Description
St. Kitts Merchant	Great Britain	The snow foundered in Mount's Bay with the loss of all hands. She was on a voyage from Saint Kitts to London.

=== 23 January ===
List of shipwrecks: 23 January 1750
Ship	State	Description
Tees	Great Britain	The ship was driven ashore near La Hague, France. She was refloated on 28 January but consequently foundered in the English Channel. Her crew were rescued by Turner (Great Britain). Tees was on a voyage from Stockton on Tees, County Durham, to Porto, Portugal.
Turner	Great Britain	The ship was driven ashore and damaged near La Hague. She was refloated on 28 January. Turner had been bound for Cádiz, Spain, but put into Dover, Kent.

=== Unknown date ===
List of shipwrecks: Unknown date 1750
Ship	State	Description
Ellis	Great Britain	The ship was lost off Loo, Cornwall, before 25 January with the loss of all hands. She was on a voyage from London to Falmouth, Cornwall.
Exeter Merchant	Great Britain	The ship was lost before 29 January. Her crew were rescued. She was on a voyage from London to Exeter, Devon.
Goodwill	Great Britain	The ship was lost on the Scottish coast with the loss of most of her crew. She was on a voyage from Whitehaven, Cumberland, to Dublin, Ireland.
Indian Queen	Great Britain	The ship was lost on the Scottish coast with the loss of most of her crew. she was on a voyage from Whitehaven to Dublin.
James	Great Britain	The ship foundered in the Atlantic Ocean off the Burlings, Portugal, before 25 January. She was on a voyage from London to Lisbon, Portugal.
Prince Frederick	Great Britain	The ship sprang a leak and was abandoned in the Atlantic Ocean 30 leagues (90 nautical miles (170 km) west of the Isles of Scilly. She subsequently drove ashore near Wicklow, Ireland.
Ulysses	Great Britain	The ship foundered in the English Channel off The Lizard, Cornwall, with the loss of all hands. She was on a voyage from London to Lisbon.
Victorious Mary-Anne	France	The ship foundered in the English Channel 3 leagues (9 nautical miles (17 km)) off Barfleur. She was on a voyage from Havre de Grâce to Lisbon.

== February ==
=== 2 February ===
List of shipwrecks: 2 February 1750
Ship	State	Description
Churchfield	Great Britain	The ship foundered in the Strait of Gibraltar off "Castill Arabetto". Her crew were rescued. She was on a voyage from Chichester, Sussex, to Genoa, and then Livorno, Grand Duchy of Tuscany.

=== 12 February ===
List of shipwrecks: 12 February 1750
Ship	State	Description
Mercury	Ireland	The ship was driven ashore at Killough, County Down. She was on a voyage from Rotterdam, South Holland, Dutch Republic to Dumfries. Mercury was later refloated and arrived at Dumfries.

=== Unknown date ===
List of shipwrecks: Unknown date 1750
Ship	State	Description
Anns	Great Britain	The ship was lost at "Avelles", on the coast of the Bay of Biscay before 15 February. Her crew were rescued.
Dursley	Ireland	The galley was lost on the North Bull, Dublin before 15 February. She was on a voyage from Philadelphia, Pennsylvania, British America, to Dublin.

== March ==
=== 4 March ===
List of shipwrecks: 4 March 1750
Ship	State	Description
Juno	France	The ship foundered in the Bay of Biscay with the loss of all hands. She was on a voyage from San Domingo to La Rochelle.

=== 16 March ===
List of shipwrecks: 16 March 1750
Ship	State	Description
Industry	Great Britain	The ship was wrecked on the Goodwin Sands, Kent, with the loss of all but three of her crew. She was on a voyage from Wells-next-the-Sea, Norfolk, to London.^{[Note 2]}

=== 23 March ===
List of shipwrecks: 23 March 1750
Ship	State	Description
Jonge Hans and Gerten	Dutch Republic	The ship was wrecked on the south coast of the Isle of Wight, Great Britain. She was on a voyage from Bordeaux, France, to Bremen.

=== Unknown date ===
List of shipwrecks: Unknown date 1750
Ship	State	Description
Diligence	Great Britain	The ship struck the pier at Dover, Kent, and sank. She was on a voyage from Hull, Yorkshire, to Rhode Island, British America. Diligence was subsequently refloated.
Elizabeth	Ireland	The ship was lost on the coast of France before 15 March. She was on a voyage from an Irish port to La Rochelle.
Endeavour	Ireland	The ship was lost at Cape Tiberoon, France, before 22 March. Her crew were rescued. She was on a voyage from Dublin to Porto, Portugal.
John	Ireland	The ship was lost on the coast of France before 5 March. She was on a voyage from Waterford to Bordeaux, France.
London Packet	Great Britain	The ship was driven ashore at Calais, France. She was on a voyage from London to Gibraltar.
Lorrain	Great Britain	The ship foundered in Mount's Bay with the loss of all hands. She was on a voyage from Málaga, Spain, to Guernsey, Channel Islands, and London.
Pengwin	Great Britain	The ship was lost at Appledore, Devon. She was on a voyage from Appledore to Newfoundland, British America.
Revenge	Great Britain	The ship was lost at Appledore. She was on a voyage from Appledore to Newfoundland.
Sarah	(Kingdom of Great Britain) British America	The ship foundered in the Atlantic Ocean 120 nautical miles (220 km) west of The Lizard, Cornwall, Great Britain. Her crew were rescued by a Dutch vessel. She was on a voyage from Carolina to a Dutch port.

== Unknown date ==
List of shipwrecks: Unknown date 1750
Ship	State	Description
Anne and Mary	Great Britain	The ship was wrecked on the Spanish coast before 10 August with the loss of all hands.
Baltimore	Great Britain	The ship foundered in the Atlantic Ocean. Her crew were rescued by a French vessel. She was on a voyage from Jamaica to Bristol, Gloucestershire.
Betsey	Great Britain	The ship foundered in the Gulf of Florida before 15 May. Her crew were rescued. She was on a voyage from Jamaica to Bristol.
Cæsar	Great Britain	The ship was lost on the coast of Carolina, British America. She was on a voyage from the Bay of Honduras to and English port.
Caledonia	Great Britain	The ship was lost at Cádiz before 9 November.
Defence	Great Britain	The ship was lost on Hispaniola, Captaincy General of Cuba before 15 June. She was on a voyage from Jamaica to Curaçao.
Duke	Great Britain	The ship was driven ashore and wrecked on the Islote de Sancti Petri, Spain, before 25 January with the loss of six of her crew. She was on a voyage from London to Marseille, France, and the Leeward Islands.
Earl of Radnor	Great Britain	The ship was driven ashore at Calabar before 4 December. She was plundered and then set afire and destroyed by the local inhabitants.
Eleanor	Great Britain	The ship was lost on the Barbary Coast before 15 June. She was on a voyage from London to Mazagan, Morocco.
Friends Adventure	Great Britain	The ship sank at Altona, Hamburg. Her crew were rescued. She was on a voyage from Cette, France, to Hamburg.
George	Great Britain	The ship struck a whale and foundered in the Atlantic Ocean before 11 December. Her crew were rescued. She was on a voyage from Newfoundland to a Spanish port.
George & Peter	Great Britain	The ship was lost near St. Lucar, Spain, before 11 December.
Humphry	Great Britain	The ship was lost on the coast of Virginia, British America, before 6 November. She was on a voyage from Barbados to Virginia.
King of Sardinia	Great Britain	The ship foundered in the Atlantic Ocean before 6 November. Her crew were rescued. She was on a voyage from Cádiz, Spain, to Newfoundland, British America.
Lamport	Great Britain	The ship was lost on the coast of British Honduras before 15 March. Her crew were rescued.
Lyme	Great Britain	The ship sank in the Bengal River, India, before 8 March.
Mary	Great Britain	The ship was driven ashore near Messina, Sicily, before 8 January. She was on a voyage from Livorno, Grand Duchy of Tuscany, to Gallipoli, Ottoman Empire.
Mary	(Kingdom of Great Britain) British America	The ship was driven ashore and wrecked on Prospect Island, Nova Scotia, before 8 March. Her crew were rescued. She was on a voyage from Nova Scotia to Cádiz, Spain.
Mercury	Great Britain	African slave trade: The ship was wrecked on a reef off Barbados before 7 December with the loss of five slaves.
Molly	Great Britain	The ship was lost in the Strait of Gibraltar before 12 June. She was on a voyage from Alicante, Spain, to Ostend, West Flanders, Dutch Republic.
Montague	Great Britain	The ship foundered in the Atlantic Ocean before 19 February. Her crew were rescued. She was on a voyage from the Bay of Honduras to London.
Nancy	Great Britain	The ship was lost on the Portuguese coast before 4 December. She was on a voyage from Cádiz to London.
Santa Pedro	Spain	The ship was wrecked on the coast of Virginia before 15 March.
Sarah & Elizabeth	Great Britain	The ship was driven ashore and wrecked in the "Western Islands". Most of her crew were rescued. She was on a voyage from Bilbao, Spain, to the Piscataqua River, Maine, British America.
Squirrel	Great Britain	The ship was driven ashore at Chesil Beach.
Success	(Kingdom of Great Britain) British America	The sloop was wrecked at Cape Hatteras, North Carolina, before 5 March. Her crew survived.
Sv. Pëtr	Russian Empire	The shitik was lost in the Near Islands in the western Catherine Archipelago. Her crew was rescued.
Two Brothers	France	The ship was lost at "Agle", Languedoc, before 22 March. She was on a voyage from Exeter, Devon, Great Britain, to Cette, Hérault.
Vigilant	France	The ship foundered in the Atlantic Ocean. She was on a voyage from Bordeaux, Gironde, to San Domingo.
Willingmind	Great Britain	The ship was burnt in the River Sherborough, Africa. Her crew survived.

== Notes ==
1. Until 1752, the year began on Lady Day (25 March) Thus 24 March 1749 was followed by 25 March 1750. 31 December 1750 was followed by 1 January 1750.
2. Issue is misdated 1750
