= Conquest of Koneswaram Temple =

Destruction and desecration of Koneswaram Temple

Destruction of Koneswaram Temple
- Part of Sinhalese–Portuguese conflicts and Thirty Years' War outside Europe
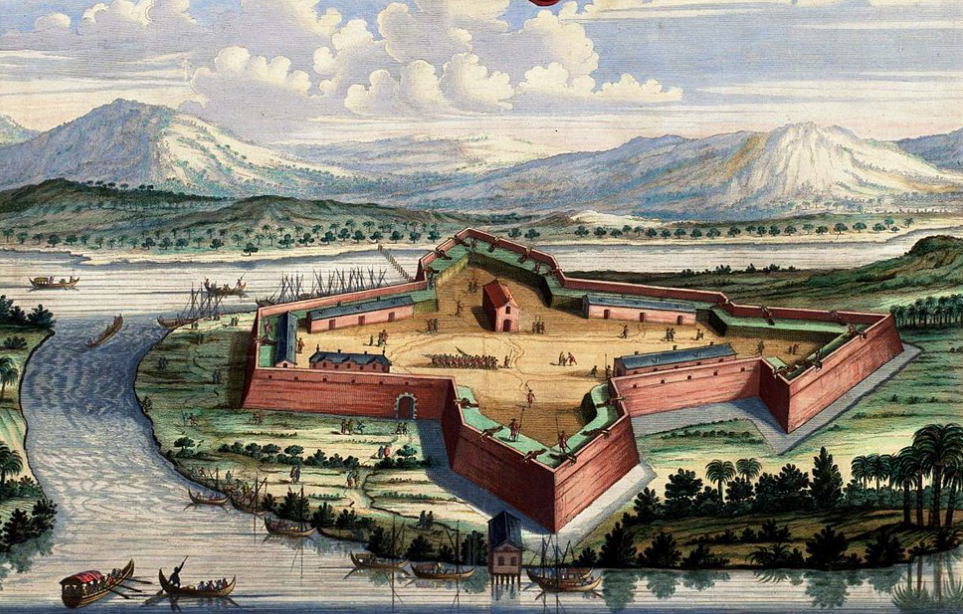
- Antique print of the Batticaloa Fort, Sri Lanka by Baldaeus and visited by Ove Gjedde
Date	April 14, 1622
Location	Koneswaram Temple, Trincomalee 8°34′57″N 81°14′44″E
Result	Portuguese victory
Territorial changes	Trincomalee conquered by the Portuguese

Belligerents
Portuguese Empire; Portuguese Ceylon	Denmark-Norway; (Danish India) East India Company; Kingdom of Kandy

Commanders and leaders
(Portuguese Ceylon) Constantino de Sá (Portuguese Ceylon) Baretto (Portuguese Ceylon) Cabral	(Danish India) Erich Grubbe (Danish India) Svend Due Senarath Adahasin

Strength
Unknown	Unknown (Note: The Danish expeditionary force was set to be 300 men, but much of the crew died during the voyage and another additional number of men left for Tranquebar. Includingly 697 Sinhalese men were promised to help build fortifications at the temple, yet its undocumented how many Danes or Sinhalese participated in the confrontation.)

Casualties and losses
Unknown	14 artillery pieces Multiple guns 2 Ships

The Destruction of the Hindu temple of Koneswaram, at Trincomalee by the Portuguese governor of Ceylon, Constantino de Sá de Noronha took place in April 1622. At the time of the desecration, Koneswaram served as a Danish fortress.

== Background ==
Since the early phases of the Crisis of the Sixteenth Century, the Portuguese Empire had started to intervene in internal Sinhalese politics by taking advantage of the rivalries and animosities among the Sinhalese kingdoms, to further their own interests. By placing puppets on the various Sinhalese kingdoms, the Portuguese slowly extended their control over the island. After the annexation of Jaffna, the kingdom of Kandy remained as the last independent Sinhalese kingdom.

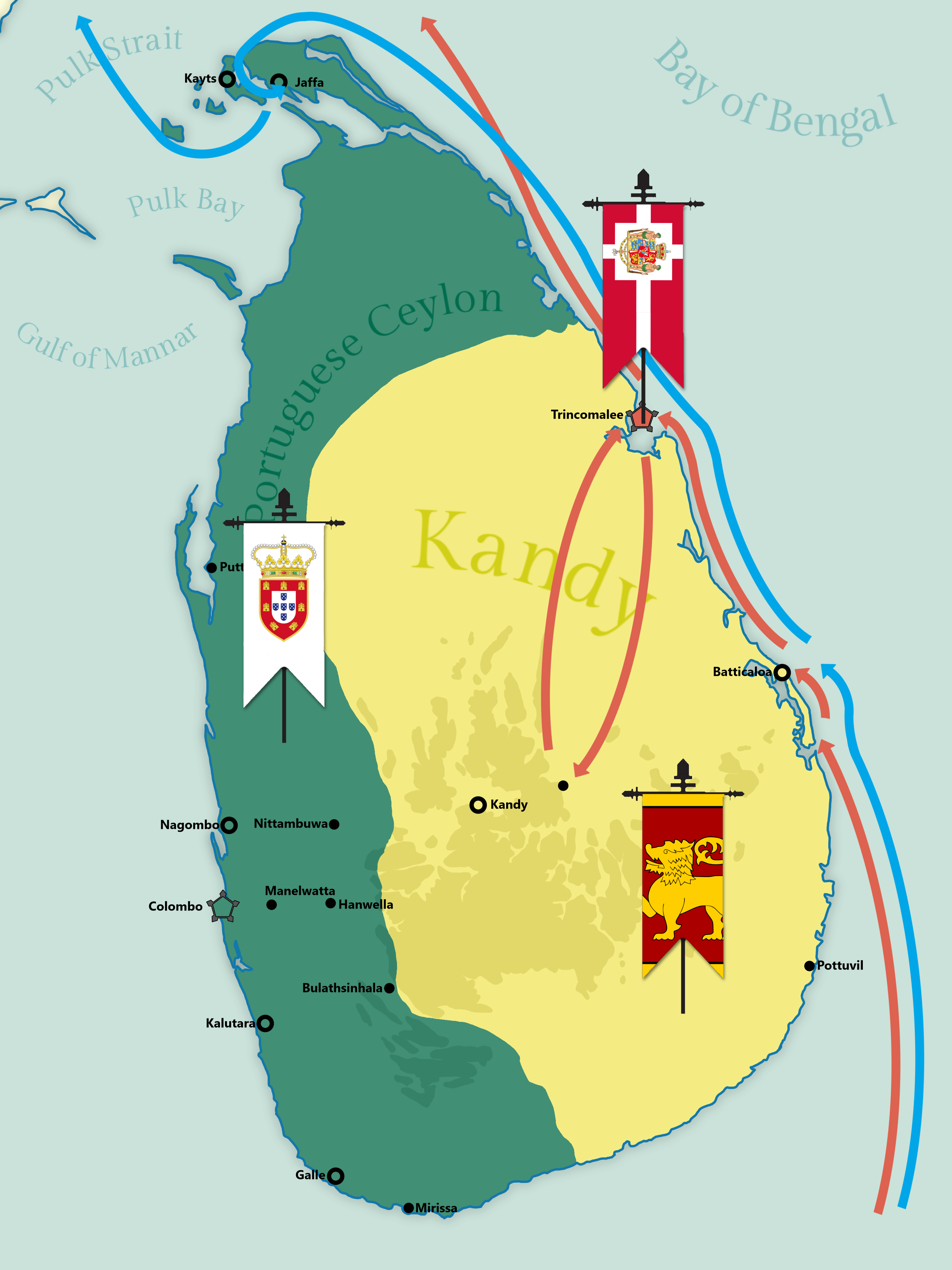
Political map of Ceylon and Ove Gjedde's expeditionary routes. Trincomalee is market with a Danish banner.

In 1611, the Portuguese captured Kandy and torched the city. In response, King Senerat of Kandy desperately sent courier Marchells Michielsz Boschouver to Europe to negotiate an alliance treaty with the Dutch East India Company. This diplomatic mission proved a failure, and instead Boschouver went to Denmark and concluded an un-ratified treaty with Christian IV of Denmark. Denmark sent five vessels and 300 soldiers, at the command of Ove Gjedde, to Ceylon to enforce the promised terms in the treaty.

=== Dano-Sinhalese negotiations and treaty ===
On 18 May 1620 the Danish expedition reached the coastal city of Trincomalee. The Sinhalese king's reaction to the Danish arrival was anticlimactic. He had made peace with the Portuguese three years prior, and did therefore not necessarily need Danish military assistance. The Sinhalese were still interested to know if the Danes (if necessary) were strong enough to defeat the Portuguese. Prolonged negotiations between the Danes, who wanted the promised monopoly on European trade on Ceylon described in the treaty made by Boschouver, and the Sinhalese who wished to have a treaty with less Danish influence. In the end, Senarat agreed to cede Trincomalee to the Danes.

== Action ==
After the final treaty, Ove Gjedde left parts of his expeditionary army in Ceylon to build a fort at Trincomalee, and he himself left for India. Gjedde left Erich Grubbe in charge of the construction of the fort. When Gjedde visited again in March 1621 he was surprised that little to nothing had been done with the fort and left disappointed.

=== Portuguese attack ===
The Portuguese quickly observed this new Danish interference in the affairs of the island, and promptly responded. On April 14, 1622 (Tamil New Year's Day), the Koneswaram temple, known by the Portuguese as the Temple of a Thousand Pillars, was attacked by the Portuguese general and governor of Portuguese Ceylon, Constantino de Sá de Noronha. During a religious procession, the shrine was destroyed, and the main statue was taken to the town. Concurrently, Portuguese soldiers disguised as Iyer priests entered the temple and looted its treasures. In an act of religious zeal, the temple was pushed over the edge and into the sea. Fleeing priests resorted to burying some of the temple's statues in the surrounding area. The Danes were forced to retreat hastily, resulting in the loss of two Danish vessels.

== Aftermath ==
Following the Danish incursion, the Portuguese recognized the necessity of establishing a fortified base on the eastern coast of Ceylon to enhance their control over the goods in the region. Therefore, they began the construction of a new triangular fort called Fort of Triquillimale, and it was quickly established by the Portuguese. The guns and artillery taken from the Danish, now served as protection of the new fort.
