= Jón Ólafsson (traveller) =

Jón Ólafsson (c. 1594–1679) was an Icelandic traveller noted for his autobiography which covers his travels in Europe and later to the Danish settlement of Tranquebar (Tharangambadi) in India.

== Works ==
English translations

- Phillpotts, Bertha S., ed. (2010) [1923]. The Life of the Icelander Jón Ólafsson, Traveller to India, Written by Himself and Completed about 1661 A. D With a Continuation, by Another Hand, up to his Death in 1679. Life and Travels: Iceland, England, Denmark, White Sea, Faroes, Spitzbergen, Norway 1593-1622. Vol. I. London: Hakluyt Society. ISBN 9781409414209.
- Anstey, Lavinia Mary (2010) [1932]. Temple, Richard (ed.). The Life of the Icelander Jón Ólafsson, Traveller to India, Written by Himself and Completed about 1661 A.D. (With a Continuation, by Another Hand, up to his Death in 1679.). Vol. II. London: Hakluyt Society. ISBN 978-1409414353.
