= Tranquebar Treaty of 1620 =

Treaty between Denmark-Norway and the Thanjavurian Nayak Kingdom

Treaty between Raghunatha Nayak and Christian IV
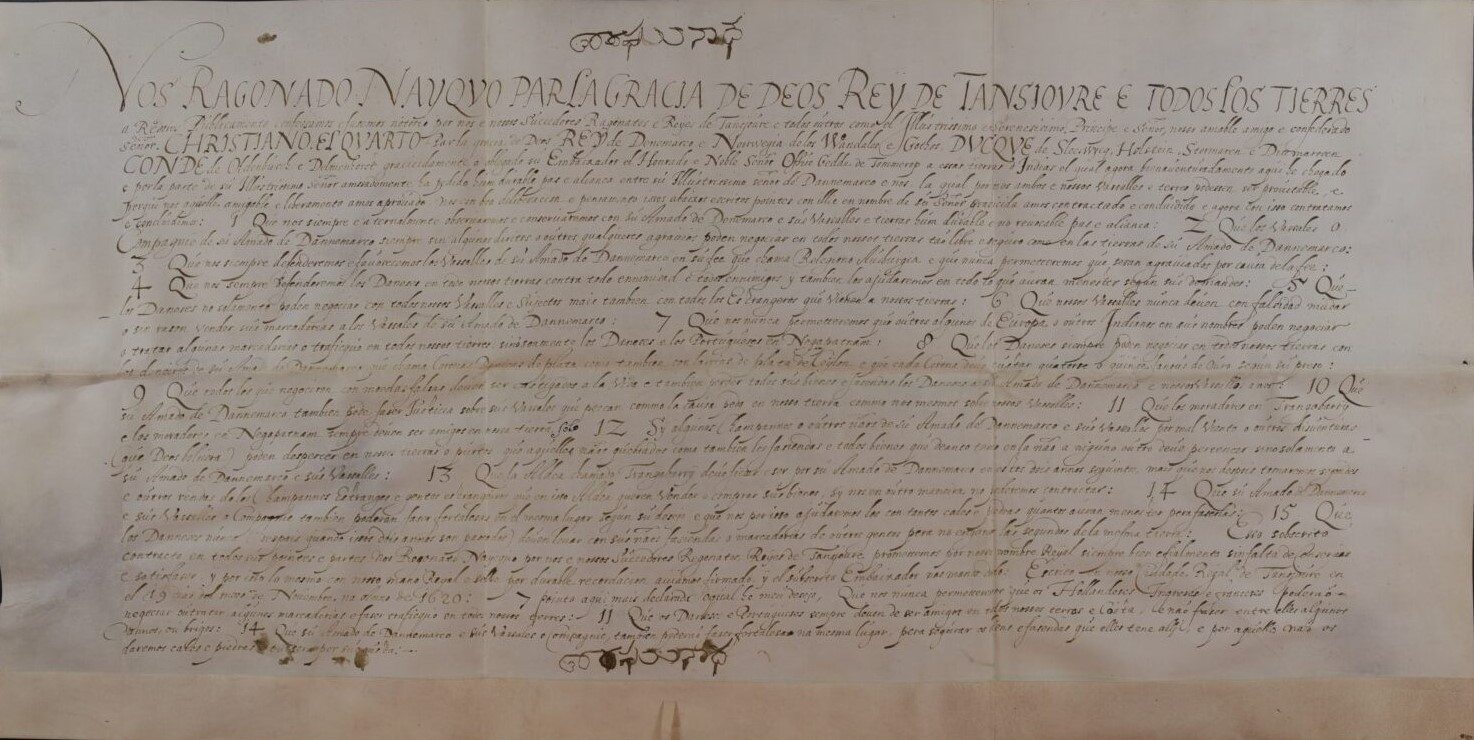
- Context: Danish East India Company tries to establish a colony in India
- Signed: 19 November 1620
- Location: Tanjore
- Negotiators: (Denmark–Norway) Roland Crappé (Denmark–Norway) Ove Gjedde; Raghunatha Nayak
- Signatories: (Denmark–Norway) Christian IV; Raghunatha Nayak
- Parties: Denmark-Norway; Thanjavur Nayak kingdom

The Tranquebar Treaty of 1620 (Danish: Trankebar traktaten af 1620) formally the Treaty between Raghunatha Nayak and Christian IV, was a treaty of friendship between the Thanjavur Nayak kingdom and Denmark–Norway in 1620. The treaty would establish Danish Tranquebar: a base that would be the headquarters of Danish India for the next 200 years.

== Background ==
in 1618 Christian IV of Denmark and the newly established Danish East India Company sent an expedition under the leadership of Ove Gjedde to Ceylon, with the intention of securing the Danish Monarchy as a part of the Asiatic trade. The negotiations on Ceylon proved to be unsuccessful and the expedition tried their luck on the Coromandel Coast. Roland Crappé, a member of the expedition who had former ties to the Thanjavur Nayak kingdom, got an audience with the Nayak of Thanjavur Raghunatha through some of his friends. The Nayak had seen a benefit in bonding with another European power in the hopes of weakening the Portuguese influence in his realm. The Nayak were willing to give the local fishing village of Tharangambadi to the Danes, and after Ove Gjedde met with the Nayak a treaty was signed.

== Treaty ==
The treaty had 15 statements including:

- Danes were given the right to trade in Thanjavur
- The Nayak were to defend the members of the Church of Denmark
- The village of Tharangambadi is to be ceded to the Danes for two years
- The Danes are to be given the right to erect a fort in Tharangambadi

== Aftermath ==
Tharangambadi (meaning the village with the singing waves) was too hard for the Danes to pronounce, and the village was therefore renamed Tranquebar (Danish: Trankebar). Tranquebar would thus be ceded to the Danes, and Gjedde would erect Fort Dansborg in its place. Tranquebar would be the headquarters of Danish trade in India for the next 225 years.

== See also ==
- Dannemarksnagore
- Dano-Mughal Treaty – Treaty between the Mughal Empire and Denmark-Norway
- Danish India – Former settlements and trading posts of Denmark and Norway on the Indian subcontinent
- Siege of Dansborg (1624) – Siege on Danish fort in India, 1624

== Works cited ==
- Brimnes, Niels (2018). Tranquebar, 1620-1845 (in Danish). danmarkshistorien.dk.
- Asgar, Svane (2020). Christian IV drømte om guld og krydderier fra Indien: Sådan blev Tranquebar en dansk koloni (in Danish). videnskab.dk.
- Karin, Knudsen (2017). Traktat (in Danish). foreningen-trankebar.dk.
- Jakobsen, Johnny (2020). Tranquebar – Danmarks første tropekoloni og dens navne (in Danish). Københavns universitet.
