= Danish East India Company =

Defunct Danish trading company

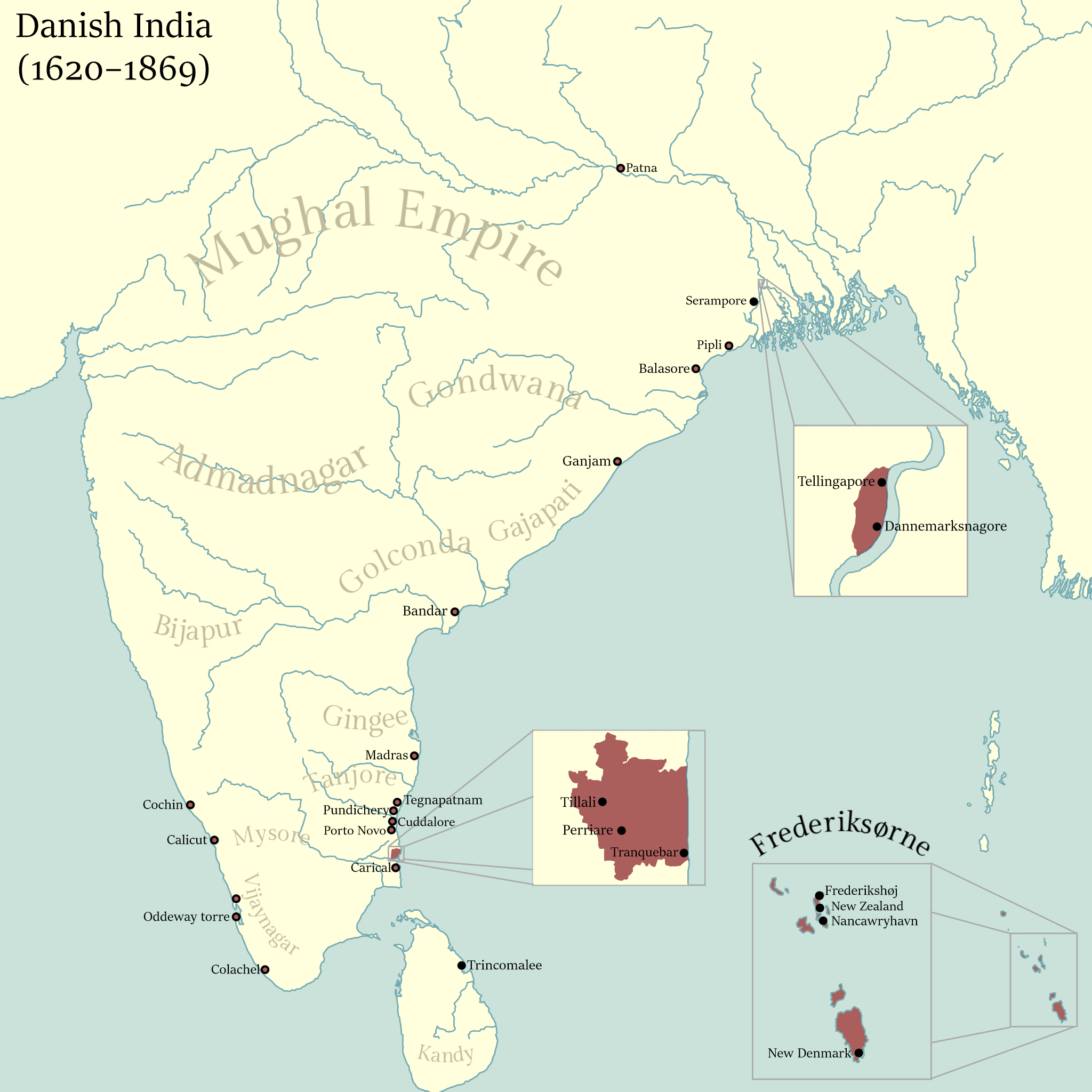
Map of Danish India

The Danish East India Company (Danish: Ostindisk Kompagni) refers to two separate Danish-Norwegian chartered companies. The first company operated between 1616 and 1650. The second company existed between 1670 and 1729, however, in 1730 it was re-founded as the Asiatic Company (Danish: Asiatisk Kompagni).

== First company ==
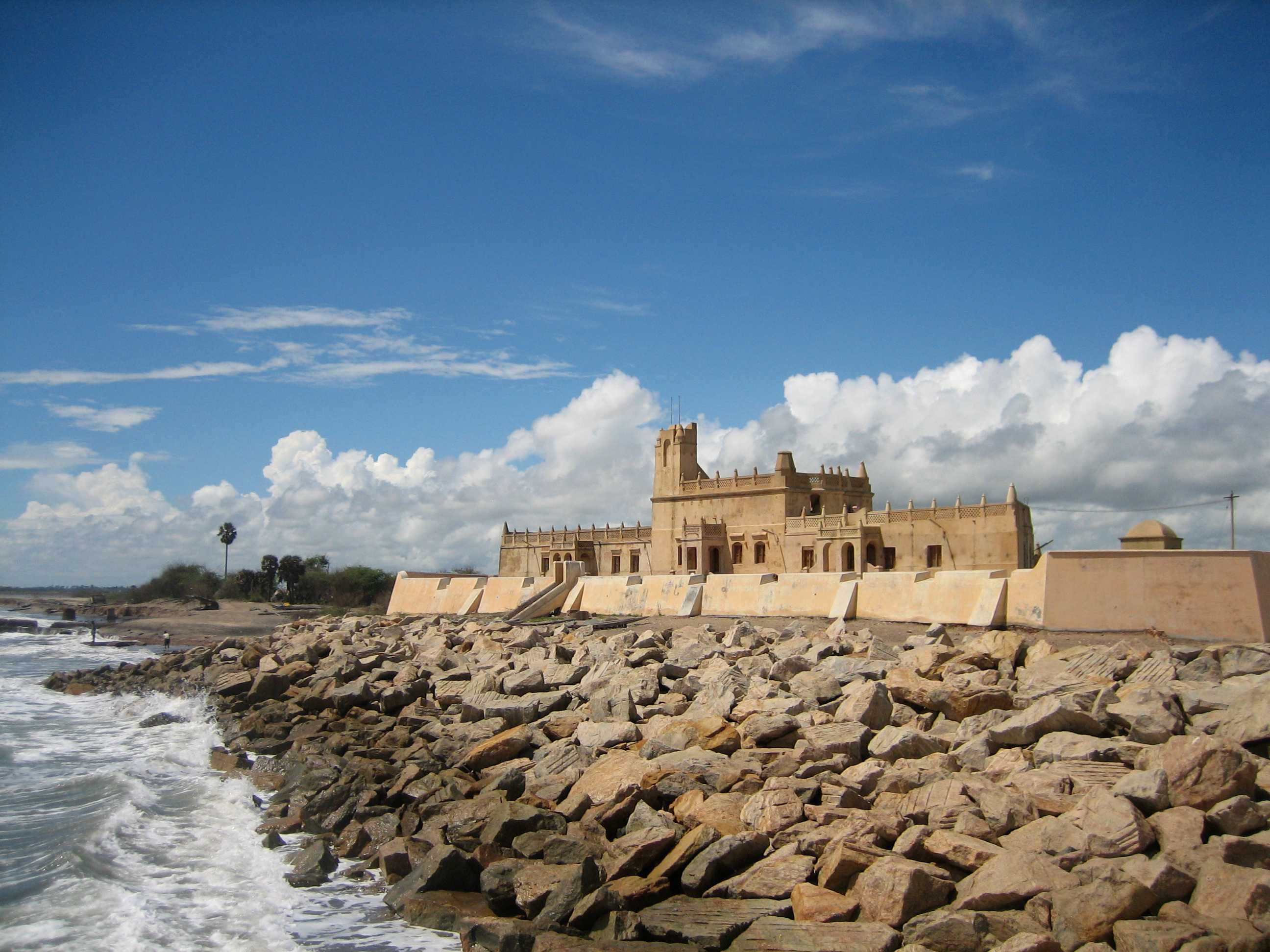
Fort Dansborg at Tranquebar, built by Ove Gedde in 1620.

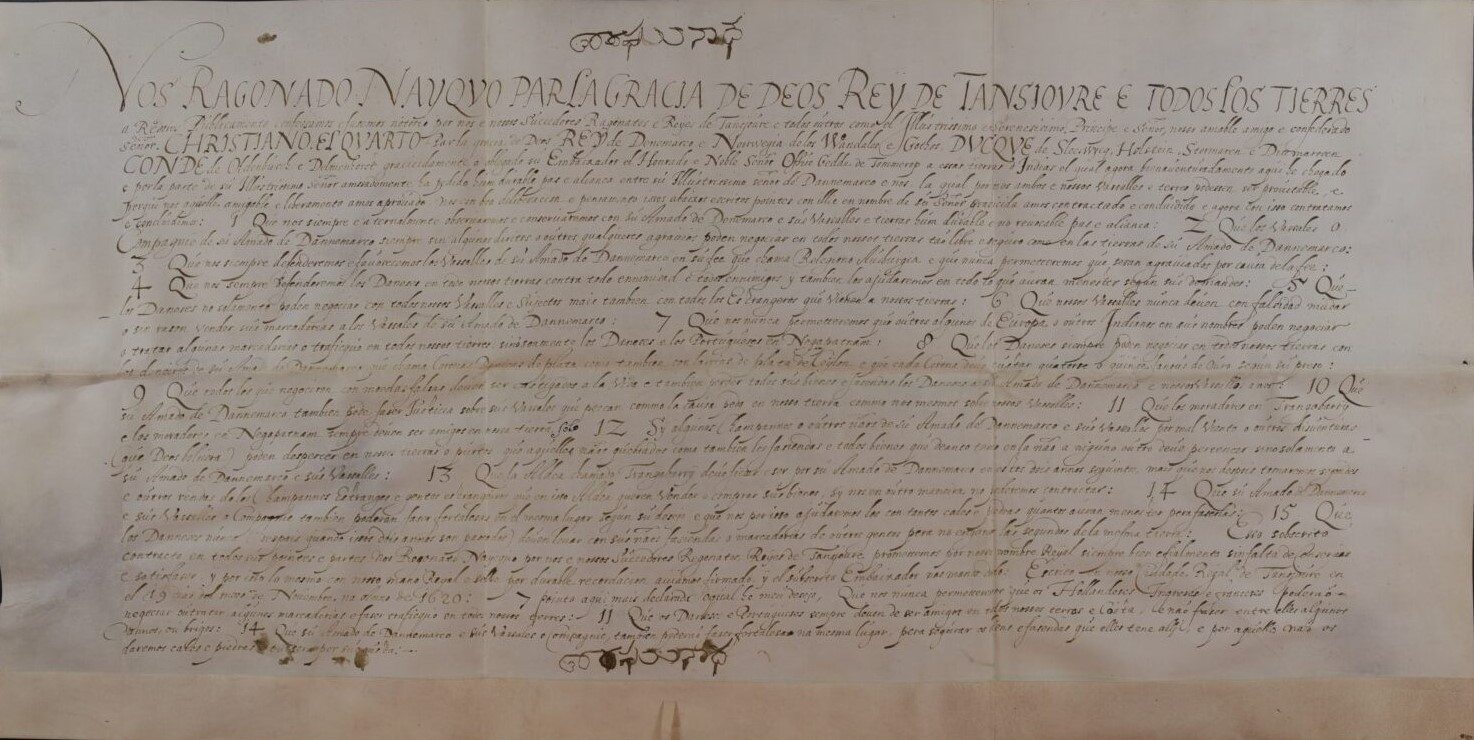
The Tranquebar Treaty of 1620.

The first Danish East India Company was chartered in 1616 under King Christian IV and focused on trade with India. The first expedition, under Admiral Gjedde, took two years to reach Ceylon, losing more than half their crew. The island had been claimed by Portugal by the time they arrived but on 10 May 1620, a treaty was concluded with the Kingdom of Kandy and the foundation laid of a settlement at Trincomalee on the island's east coast. They occupied the colossal Koneswaram temple in May 1620 to begin fortification of the peninsula before being expelled by the Portuguese. After landing on the Indian mainland, a treaty was concluded with the ruler of the Tanjore Kingdom, Raghunatha Nayak, who gave the Danes possession of the town of Tranquebar, and permission to trade in the kingdom by treaty of 19 November 1620. In Tranquebar they established Dansborg and installed Captain Roland Crappé as the first governor (opperhoved) of Danish India. The treaty was renewed on 30 July 1621, and afterwards renewed and confirmed on the 10 May 1676, by Shivaji the founder of the Maratha Empire.

During their heyday, the Danish East India Company and Swedish East India Company imported more tea than the British East India Company, smuggling 90% of it into England, where it could be sold at a huge profit. Between 1624-36, Danish trade extended to Surat, Bengal, Java, and Borneo, with factories in Masulipatam, Surat, Balasore and at Java, but subsequent European wars in which Denmark participated ruined the Company, and trade in India ceased entirely between 1643–69, during which time all previous acquisitions were lost except Tranquebar, which held out until aid from Denmark arrived in 1669.

== Second company, 1670–1729 ==
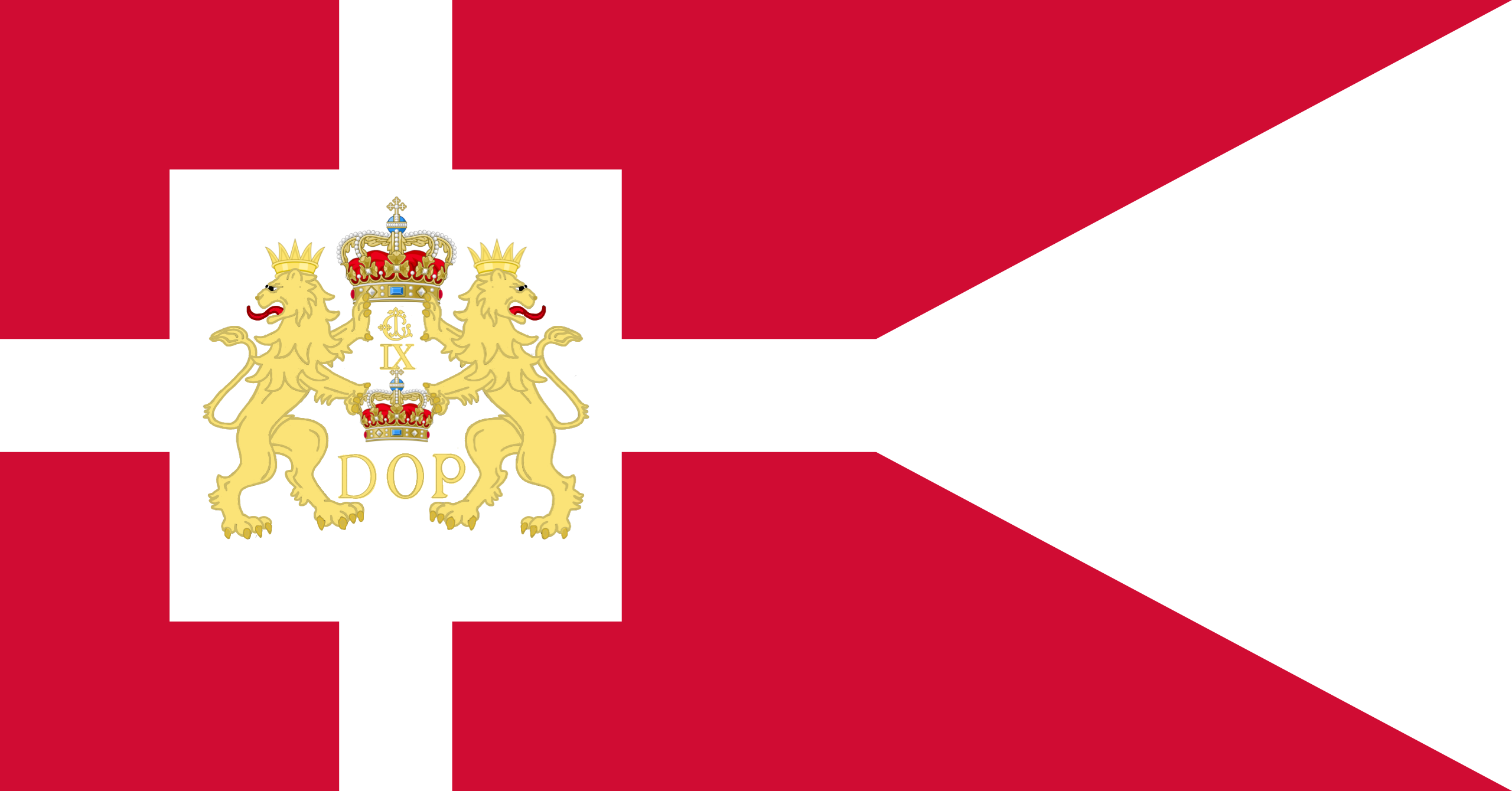
Colonial Merchant Ensign of Danish India

In 1670, a second Danish East India Company was established- The first board of directors consisted of then-retired admiral Cort Adeler, vice president of Kommercekollegiet Jens Juel, Admiralty Councillor Paul von Klingeberg, Supreme Court justice Thomas Fincke, Supreme Court justice Peder Pedersøn Lerche and stamped-paper manager Albert Heintz.

Back in 1668, the naval ship HDMS Færø had already been sent to Tranquebar. In 1670, Dansborg was ceded to the company. In 1674, Sivert Adeler was installed as the new governor of Danish India. In 1682, he was replaced by Axel Juel.

The company found itself unable to finance any expeditions between 1721 and 1725. The result was that private expeditions were tolerated in return for the payment of a fee to the company. It too was dissolved in 1729.

== Ships ==
- Kiøbenhavn and Christian (1618–1621, part of the Gjedde expedition that founded Dansborg at Tranquebar)
- Christianshavn (8 November 1639, Willem Leyel left Denmark for Tranquebar as commander of this ship)
- Flyvende Ulv (Departure from Copenhagen 1682 with Axel Juhl, who was appointed governor of Tranquebar later the same year. Departure from Copenhagen 1685 with Wollf Heinrich v. Calnein, governor of Tranquebar 1687)
- Cron Printz Christian (Cron Printzen) and Den gyldne Løve (1730–31, the Tønder expedition that opened trade with China - Den gyldne Løve was shipwrecked in Ireland)
- Elephant(en) (1747–1750) The ship was lost on 15 August 1750 in "Mosele Bay", near the Cape of Good Hope. There were 35 survivors; they were rescued by Onwerkirk (Dutch Republic). Elephant was on a voyage from Tranquebar, India to Copenhagen.
- Grev Moltke (1760, first Moravian missionaries)
- Nicobar Sunk 1783 with load of Swedish Plate Money.
- Disco (1778 ship), frigate built for the Danish navy and named for Disko Island, but transferred to Danish EIC before maiden voyage.
- Hussar, purchased 1783.
- Holsten (I), renamed from Det Store Bælt, declared unseaworthy and condemned at Mauritius in 1807
- Holsten (II) purchased in 1806 from the French at Mauritius and renamed to replace Holsten (I). Seized by the British (HMS Modeste (1793), HMS Terpsichore (1785) and HMS Dasher) on the Hooghly in January 1808. Six other Danish ships were seized at the same time

== See also ==
- Danish India
- Danish Mission College
- Tranquebar Mission
- Danish West India Company
- British East India Company
- Assada Company, English trading company, founded 1635 and ceased 1657
- Austrian East India Company, founded 1775 and ceased 1785
- Dutch East India Company, founded 1602 and ceased 1798
- French East India Company, founded 1723 and ceased 1769
- Portuguese East India Company, founded 1628 and ceased 1633
- Swedish East India Company, founded 1731 and ceased 1813
- List of trading companies
- Whampoa anchorage
