= Grounding of the Nattergalen =

1626 grounding of a Danish ship

- Part of the prelude to the Dano-Mughal War
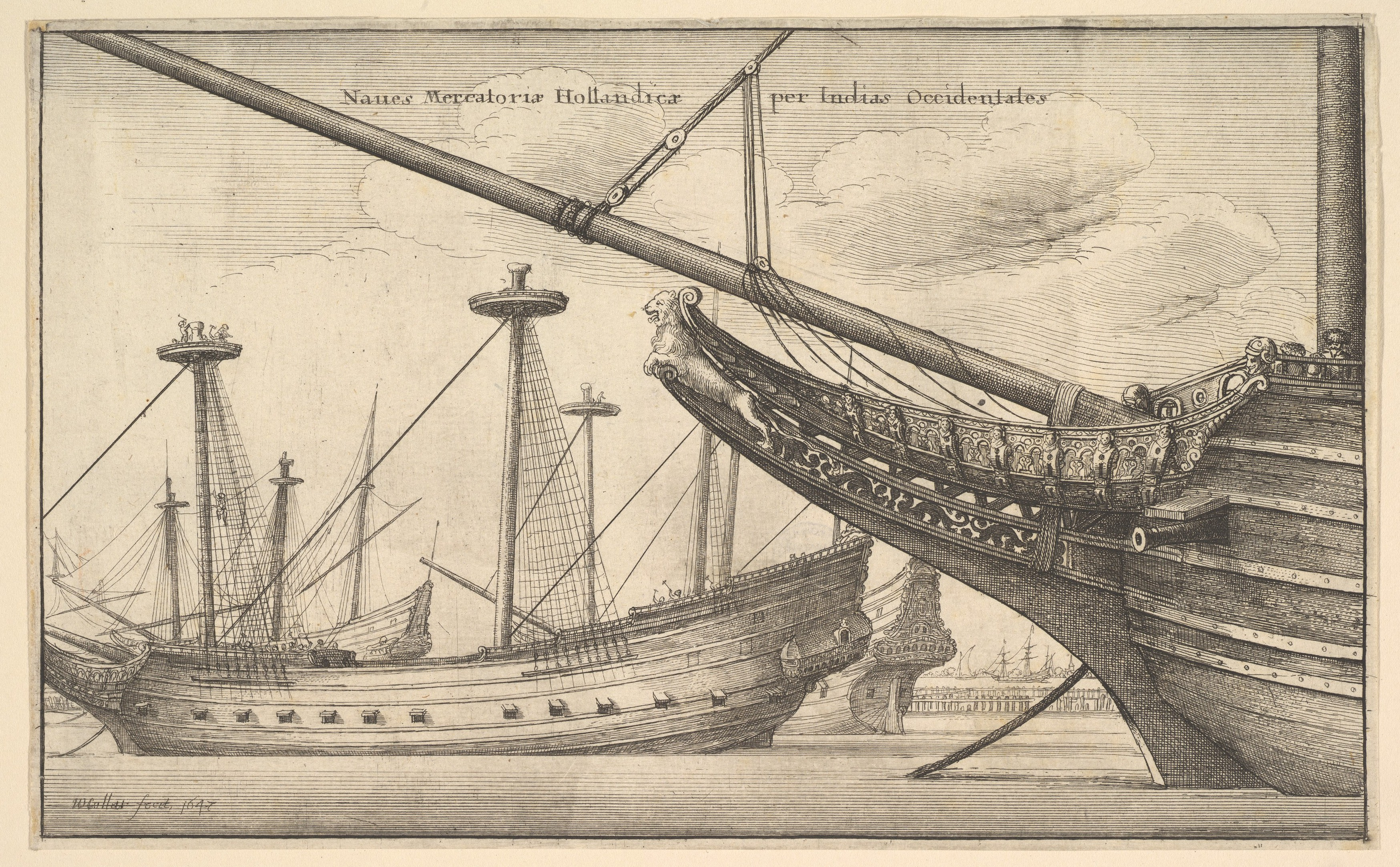
- A Dutch West Indiaman from Navium Variæ Figuræ et Formæ, by Wenceslaus Hollar in 1647
Date	1626 (Note: Danish historian Jan Rindom asserts that the grounding took place in early 1627.)
Location	Off Pipli, Mughal Empire (near present-day Kirtania Port, India)
Result	Mughal victory
Territorial changes	Danish factories at Pipli and Balasore are abandoned

Opposing parties
Mughal Empire; Bengal Subah	Danish India

Commanders and leaders
Unk. Nawab	(Danish India) Unk. captain (POW)

Units involved
Unknown	(Danish India) Nattergalen

Strength
Unknown	1 ship 35 men

Casualties and losses
None	1 ship 35 men imprisoned

The grounding of the Nattergalen (transl. Nightingale) and subsequent Mughal imprisonment of its Danish crew took place in 1625 off the coast of Pipli in Bengal.

After a successful voyage to the Sunda Islands, the Danish vessel, Nattergalen, ran aground off Bengal during its return voyage. Despite most of its crew being saved by the Mughal government, they were imprisoned by the local Mughal Nawab and transported to Cuttack, only being released after the Danes had sent a considerable gift to the Nawab.

== Background ==
In 1616, the Danish East India Company was founded, and after a successful expedition to India in 1620, it established the colony of Tranquebar. Afterwards, Danish ships were regularly sent to India. As such, in October 1624, the D.E.I.C. management in Copenhagen sent 2 ships to Tranquebar, Christianshavn and the yacht Nattergalen (transl. Nightingale), for 97,500 Danish rigsdaler, reaching Tranquebar in the following year.

=== Voyage to Bantam ===
In the same year, (Note: According to Mary Mackenzie of the Royal Asiatic Society of Sri Lanka, Nattergalen became involved in the intra-Asian trade between late 1626 and early 1627.) Nattergalen, together with the governor of Tranquebar, Roland Crappé, on Christianshavn, became involved in the intra-Asian trade, initiating a voyage that would end at the port of Bantam. After reaching Masulipatnam and Makassar, where the ships got a cargo of cloves, the ships continued to Sukadana and Banjarmasin on Borneo in May 1626 before reaching Bantam. Afterwards, Nattergalen initiated a return voyage from Bantam.

== Grounding ==
However, in 1626 during its voyage, Nattergalen grounded off the coast of Pipli in Bengal during a cyclone. The ship itself perished, and its cargo was consequently lost, although the crew was saved by the Mughal government. Nevertheless, the 35-man-strong crew was imprisoned by the local Mughal Nawab and transported to Cuttack.

=== Release of the survivors ===
Meanwhile, Governor Crappé on Christianshavn safely reached Balasore, but had to stay there due to long negotiations with the Nawab about the release of the survivors from Nattergalen. Eventually, the crew at Cuttack was released after the Danes had sent a gift to the Nawab to the value of 20,000 Danish rigsdaler.

== Aftermath ==
The incident, together with the grounding of Jupiter, was a major blow to Crappé and left the Danish factory in Pipli without money. Crappé subsequently abandoned trade in Bengal, and the Danish factories in Pipli and Balasore were left in the charge of Indian caretakers.

=== Casus belli for the Dano-Mughal War ===
The D.E.I.C.'s later economic difficulties partially resulted from the grounding of Nattergalen, and consequently, it was seen by the Danes as reasonable to demand the unpaid compensation. Already after its grounding, many of the high-ranking Danes in Tranquebar planned to get compensation through military means; however, Crappé would not risk a confrontation with the Mughal emperor without the company management's approval. Later in 1644, during the Dano-Mughal War, the governor of Tranquebar, Willem Leyel, launched a privateering campaign against the Mughal Empire with the compensation of grounded ships as the primary goal for the campaign. As such, the grounding of Nattergalen was consequently mentioned in his manifesto justifying the war.

== See also ==
- Grounding of the Jupiter – 1625 grounding of a Danish ship
- Grounding of the St. Jacob – 1640 grounding of a Danish ship

== Notes and citations ==
=== Works cited ===
- Larsen, Kay (1908). De dansk-ostindiske koloniers historie – De Bengalske loger & Nikobarerne [History of the Danish East Indian Colonies – The Bengali Lodges & the Nicobar Islands] (in Danish). Vol. 2. Copenhagen, Denmark: Centralforlaget. p. 12 – via Danskernes Historie Online.
- Bredsdorff, Asta (1 January 1999). Willem Leyels liv og farefulde rejse til Indien [The Trials and Travels of Willem Leyel] (PDF). Søhistoriske Skifter. Vol. 21. Copenhagen, Denmark: Museum Tusculanum Press. ISBN 87-7289-498-9. ISSN 0107-6647.
- Mackenzie, Mary (September 1946). "Further History of the Danish Trade with the East Indies". Journal of the Ceylon Branch of the Royal Asiatic Society. 37 (102). Colombo, Sri Lanka: Royal Asiatic Society of Sri Lanka: 107–116. JSTOR 45385474 – via JSTOR.
- Rindom, Jan (September 1995). Ostindisk Kompagni 1616–1650 [East India Company 1616–1650] (PDF) (Master's thesis) (in Danish). Copenhagen, Denmark: University of Copenhagen.
- Wellen, Kathryn (2015). "The Danish East India Company's War against the Mughal Empire, 1642-1698" (PDF). Journal of Early Modern History. 19 (5). Leiden, the Netherlands: Brill Publishers: 439–461. doi:10.1163/15700658-12342470. eISSN 1568-5209. ISSN 0022-4995.
