= Grounding of the Jupiter =

1625 grounding of a Danish ship

- Part of the prelude to the Dano-Mughal War
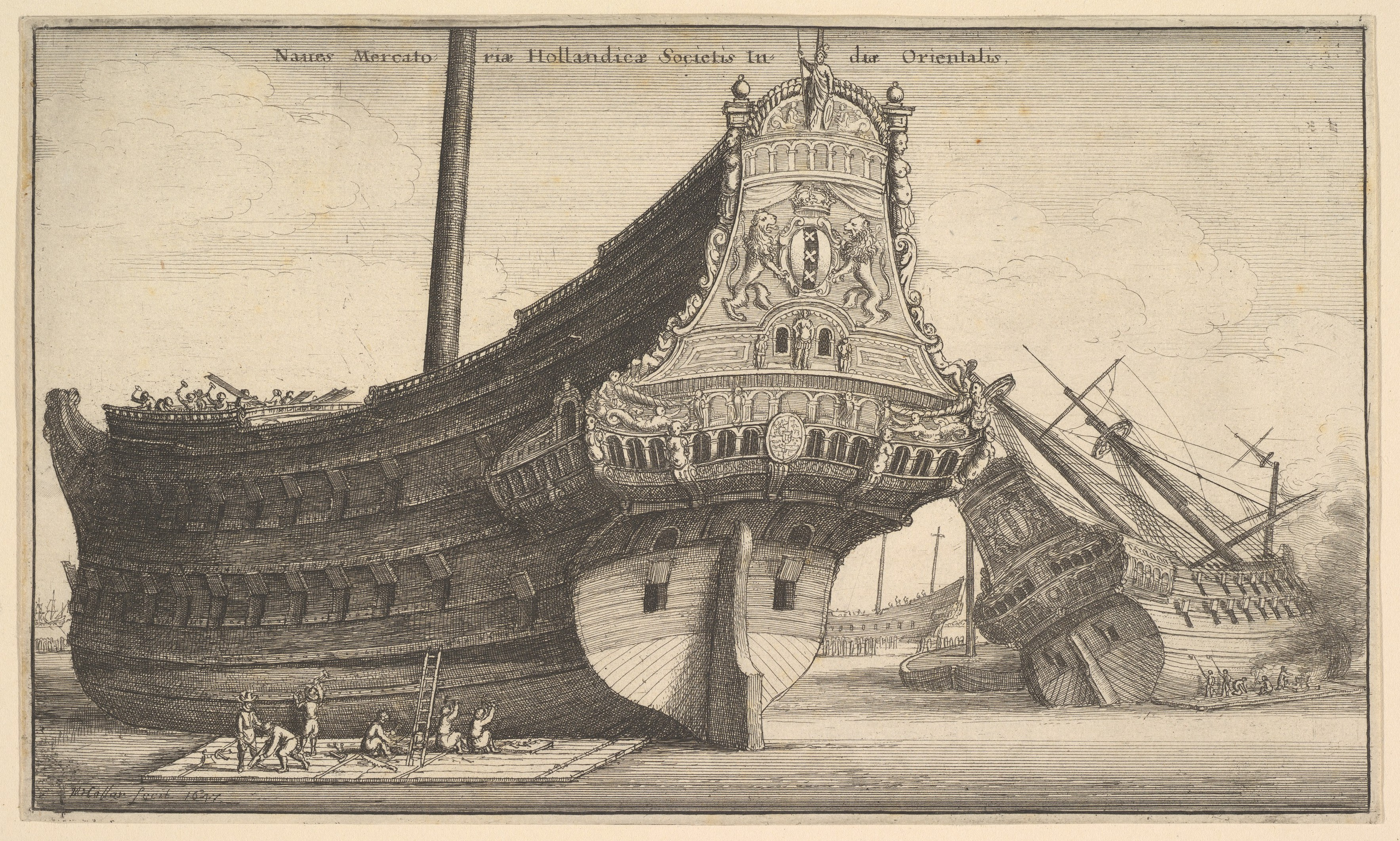
- A Dutch East Indiaman from Navium Variæ Figuræ et Formæ, by Wenceslaus Hollar in 1647
| Date | 1625 |
| Location | Off Bengal, Mughal Empire (present-day Odisha, India) |
| Result | Mughal victory |
| Territorial changes | Danish factories at Pipli and Balasore are abandoned |

Opposing parties
| Mughal Empire; Bengal Subah | Danish India |

Commanders and leaders
| Babar Khan | (Danish India) Unk. captain (POW) |

Units involved
| Unknown | (Danish India) Jupiter |

Strength
| Unknown | 1 ship c. 45–53 men |

Casualties and losses
| None | 1 ship 44–45 men died or killed |

The grounding of the Jupiter and subsequent death of its Danish crew in Mughal imprisonment took place in 1625 off the coast of Bengal in present-day Odisha.

After a successful voyage to Bantam and Makassar, the Danish yacht Jupiter initiated a return voyage to the Coromandel Coast. However, Jupiter ran aground off Bengal, with some of its crew drowning, while the rest were imprisoned by the local Mughal Nawab, Babar Khan, and subsequently died. The 8 Danes surviving were released by the Mughals after the Danes paid a ransom to Babar.

== Background ==
In 1616, the Danish East India Company was founded, and after a successful expedition to India in 1620, it established the colony of Tranquebar. Afterwards, the governor of Tranquebar, Roland Crappé, established multiple factories all over the East Indies.

=== The Jupiter ===
In 1623, Governor Crappé initiated his return to Danish India after having been in Denmark, bringing with him the vessels Perlen and Jupiter, the latter of which was a yacht. The ships arrived at Tranquebar in 1624, during a siege of the city, which was shortly after concluded.

==== Voyage to Makassar ====
In the following year, Jupiter became involved in the intra-Asian trade and was sent on a trade mission to Makassar on Celebes and the other Sunda Islands. After a successful voyage to the ports of Bantam and Makassar, where it got a valuable Makassarese cargo, consisting of 22,000 pounds (10,000 kg) of cloves and other goods, Jupiter initiated a return voyage from the latter port to the Coromandel coast.

== Grounding ==
However, during its voyage,Jupiter grounded in a sudden storm off the coast off Bengal in present-day Odisha, with some historians specifying the location to be off Balasore, (Note: Despite being located in present-day Odisha, Balasore was then a part of the Bengal Subah.) while others mention Manikapatnam.

=== Balasore account ===
In the account of those claiming it grounded in Balasore, the incident occurred after Jupiter had anchored off the Danish factory in Balasore for a day. During the day, the local Mughal Nawab, Babar Khan, imprisoned parts of the crew, including the captain, who was tied up after trying to prevent Babar from taking a Danish slave who had been carrying many valuables up from the beach to the Danish factory. As the captain was absent, Jupiter lacked proficient leadership, and when a storm occurred in the subsequent night, the ship consequently grounded. Additionally, the Mughal government refused to help it despite it being in visible danger and the whole cargo of the ship was thereafter seized and plundered by Babar Khan. (Note: According to contemporary Mughal legislation, it was permissible for a local Nawab to seize a ship at sea with no crew. Nevertheless, it would be illegal to demand a ransom for the release of the survivors.)

=== Casualties ===
Historians generally agree that a total of 45 men died; (Note: Stephan Diller puts this number at 44, while some historians only mention 20 deaths.) however, they disagree on how they died: While some claim all died by drowning, most say this only caused some casualties, which was estimated to be 25 men by Danish colonial historian Kay Larsen. The remaining 20 died in prison, with some claiming that they were killed by Babar Khan. Nevertheless, it is more plausible that they may just have died from food poisoning or something similar.

=== Release of the survivors ===
Only 8 men survived, who continued to be imprisoned. After long negotiations and threats between the Danish factory in Balasore and Babar Khan, the surviving Danes, including the captain, were released by the Mughals after the Danes had given gifts and paid a ransom to Babar. Followingly, the Danes requested compensation for their losses, but these were unfulfilled.

== Aftermath ==
=== Estimated losses ===
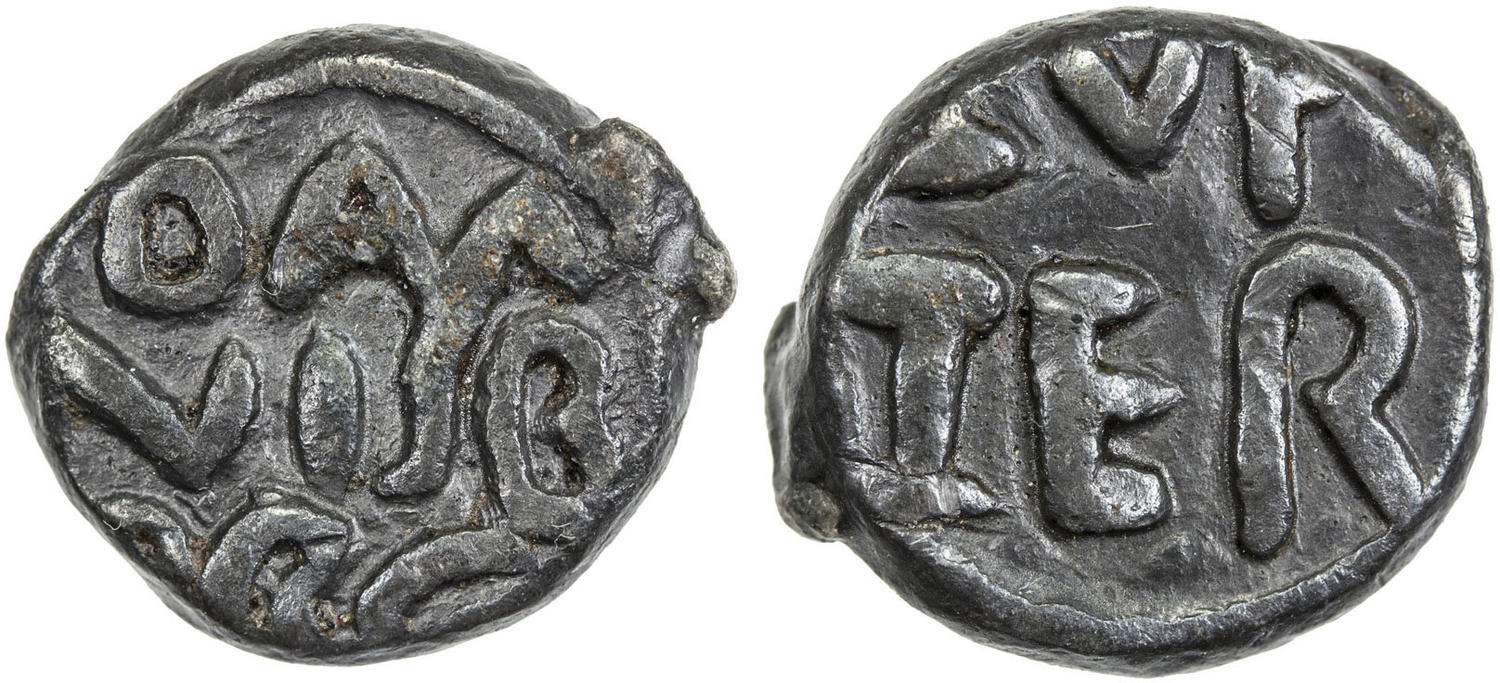
A coin with the inscription Dannisborg-Iupter, which presumably refers to Jupiter. Due to its grounding, the coin is very rare and only one has been found

Roland Crappé estimated the loss of the ship itself at 20,000 Danish rigsdaler, although historians put this at about 2,300 Danish rigsdaler. Nonetheless, the cargo on the ship was estimated by Crappé at 150,000 Danish rigsdaler or 50,000 Spanish reales, if it could be traded in Masulipatnam. To the total amount may also be added the expenses of the ransom the Danes had to pay to release the few survivors from their imprisonment.

=== Economic consequences ===
The grounding of Jupiter was a big loss for the D.E.I.C., which already suffered from a lack of men and capital. The incident, together with the grounding of Nattergalen, left the Danish factory in Pipli without money. Crappé subsequently abandoned trade in Bengal, and the Danish factories in Pipli and Balasore were left in the charge of Indian caretakers.

==== Casus belli for the Dano-Mughal War ====
The company's later economic difficulties partially resulted from the grounding of Jupiter, and consequently, it was seen by the Danes as reasonable to demand the unpaid compensation. Already after its grounding, many of the high-ranking Danes in Tranquebar planned to get compensation through military means; however, Crappé would not risk a confrontation with the Mughal emperor without the company management's approval. Later in 1644, during the Dano-Mughal War, the governor of Tranquebar, Willem Leyel, launched a privateering campaign against the Mughal Empire with the compensation of grounded ships as the primary goal for the campaign. As such, the grounding of Jupiter became the first incident mentioned in his manifesto justifying the war.

== See also ==
- Grounding of the St. Jacob – 1640 grounding of a Danish ship
- Capture of the ship The Bengali Prize – 1642 Dano-Mughal War confrontation
- Grounding of the Nattergalen – 1626 grounding of a Danish ship

== Notes and citations ==
=== Works cited ===
- Larsen, Kay (1908). De dansk-ostindiske koloniers historie – De Bengalske loger & Nikobarerne [History of the Danish East Indian Colonies – The Bengali Lodges & the Nicobar Islands] (in Danish). Vol. 2. Copenhagen, Denmark: Centralforlaget – via Danskernes Historie Online.
- Wellen, Kathryn (2015). "The Danish East India Company's War against the Mughal Empire, 1642-1698" (PDF). Journal of Early Modern History. 19 (5). Leiden, the Netherlands: Brill Publishers: 439–461. doi:10.1163/15700658-12342470. eISSN 1568-5209. ISSN 0022-4995.
- Bonefeld, Olav Jørgen (1977). Henningsen, Henning; Poulsen, Hanne (eds.). "Skibsnavne på blymønter fra Trankebar" [Ship names on lead coins from Tranquebar] (PDF). Handels- og Søfartsmuseet på Kronborg (in Danish). 36. Helsingør, Denmark: Selskabet Handels- og Søfartsmuseets Venner – via Danskernes Historie Online.
- Diller, Stephan (1 June 1999). Die Dänen in Indien, Südostasien und China (1620-1845) [The Danes in India, Southeast Asia and China (1620–1845)]. South China and Maritime Asia (in German). Vol. 8. Wiesbaden, Germany: Harrassowitz Verlag. ISBN 978-3-447-04123-2. ISSN 0945-9286.
- Liisberg, Henrik Carl Bering [in Danish], ed. (1919). Danmarks Søfart og Søhandel [Danish Shipping and Maritime Trade] (PDF) (in Danish). Copenhagen, Denmark: Nyt Nordisk Forlag – via Danmarks Tekniske Kulturarv.
  - Larsen, Sofus Kristian. "De store opdagelser og den danske søfart". In Liisberg (1919).
  - Olsen, Albert Georg. "Almindelig skibsfart og søhandel i XVII–XIX aarhundrede". In Liisberg (1919).
  - Bastrup, C. "Den ostindiske sejlation og handel". In Liisberg (1919).
- Lingen, Jan; Lucassen, Jan (1 January 2007). Amiteshwar, Jha; Sanjay, Garg (eds.). "The 'Mansuri' or 'Munsooree Paisa and its Use: Combining Numismatic and Social History of India, c. 1830-1900". Numismatic Digest. 31 (1st ed.). Mumbai, India: Indian Institute for Research in Numismatic Studies: 226. ASIN B0062V9A84. ISBN 978-8186786260.
- Mackenzie, Mary (September 1946). "Further History of the Danish Trade with the East Indies". Journal of the Ceylon Branch of the Royal Asiatic Society. 37 (102). Colombo, Sri Lanka: Royal Asiatic Society of Sri Lanka: 107–116. JSTOR 45385474 – via JSTOR.
- Bredsdorff, Asta (1 January 1999). Willem Leyels liv og farefulde rejse til Indien [The Trials and Travels of Willem Leyel] (PDF). Søhistoriske Skifter. Vol. 21. Copenhagen, Denmark: Museum Tusculanum Press. ISBN 87-7289-498-9. ISSN 0107-6647.
- Subrahmanyam, Sanjay (March 1990). Bayly, Christopher Alan; Hawthorn, Geoffrey; Johnson, Gordon; et al. (eds.). Political Economy of Commerce: Southern India 1500–1650. Cambridge South Asian Studies (1st ed.). Port Chester, New York / Melbourne, Australia / Sydney: Cambridge University Press. ASIN B0FTT74764. doi:10.1017/CBO9780511563423. ISBN 978-0511563423.
