= Grounding of the St. Jacob =

1640 grounding of a Danish ship

grounding of the St. Jacob
- Part of the prelude to the Dano-Mughal War
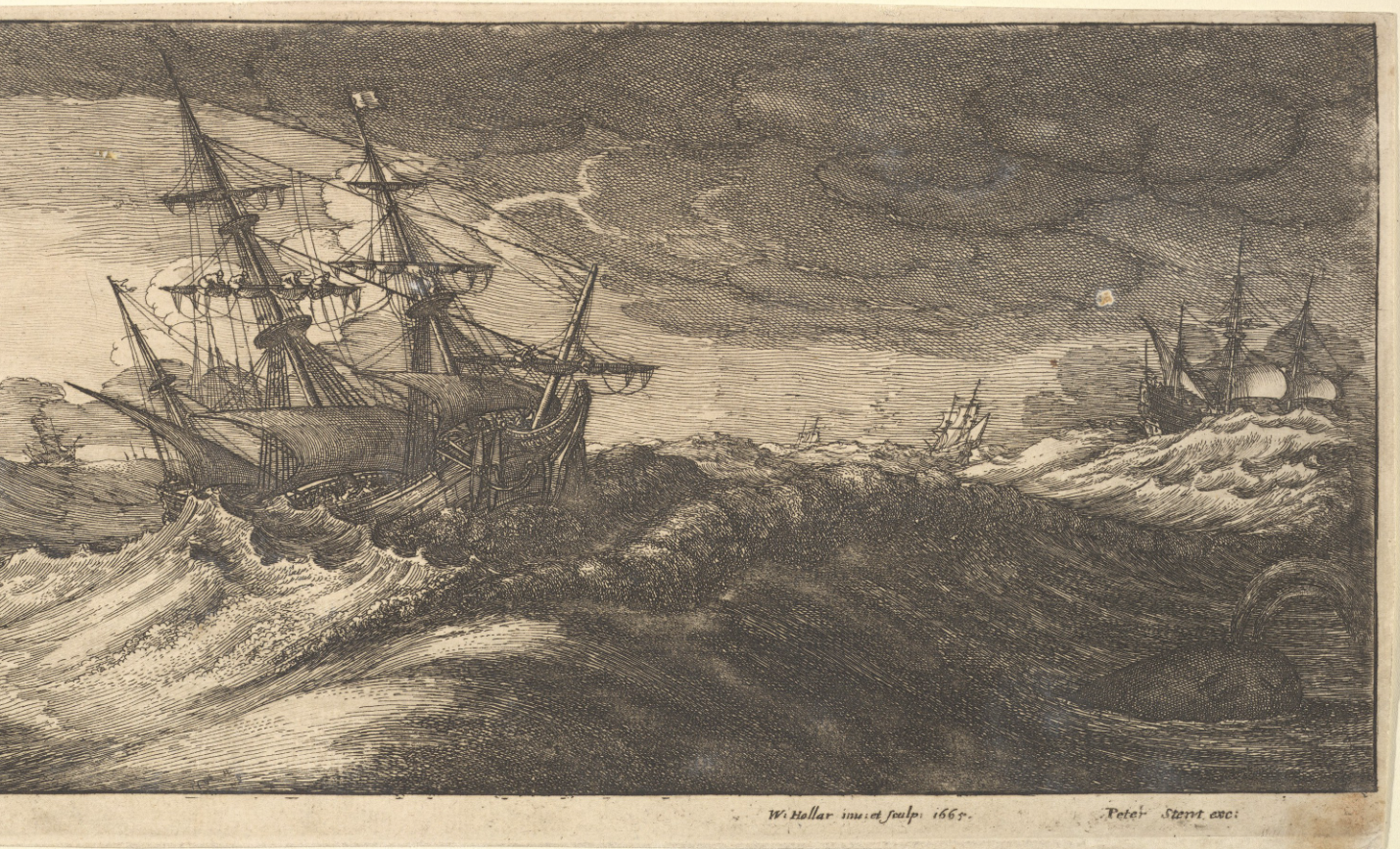
- A warship in a storm from Sea Storms, by Wenceslaus Hollar in 1665
Date	1640
Location	Off Pipli, Mughal Empire (near present-day Kirtania Port, India)
Result	Mughal victory
Territorial changes	Danish factory at Masulipatnam is abandoned

Opposing parties
Mughal Empire; Bengal Subah	Danish India Gowa

Commanders and leaders
Hadi Gayas; Siaraskhan	(Danish India) Nicolaj Samson Mollah Mumin #

Units involved
Unknown	(Danish India) St Jacob

Strength
Unknown	(Danish India) 1 ship (Danish India) Unknown no. of men (Note: Yachts usually had a crew of 40 men, with an additional 15 to 20 armed men.) 50 men

Casualties and losses
None	(Danish India) 1 ship (Danish India) 43 men died 50 men imprisoned

The grounding of the St. Jacob and subsequent death of its Danish crew in Mughal custody took place in 1640 off the coast of Pipli in Bengal in present-day Odisha.

After a successful voyage to Bantam and Makassar, the Danish yacht, St. Jacob, initiated a return voyage to Masulipatnam; however, St. Jacob got caught in a storm and was driven towards the coast of Bengal. Its crew tried to save the ship, yet to no avail, and as the local Mughal faujdar, Hadi Gayas, denied the ship any assistance, St. Jacob consequently ran aground. The surviving Danes reached the coast, where they allegedly were poisoned by Gayas, causing 16 men to die within 3 days.

The grounding of St. Jacob was such a severe blow for the Danish East India Company that it became the immediate casus belli for the Dano-Mughal War.

== Background ==
In 1616, the Danish East India Company was founded, and after a successful expedition to India in 1620, it established the colony of Tranquebar. Afterwards, Danish ships were regularly sent to India.

=== The St. Jacob ===
On 6 October 1635, the ship St. Anna and the yacht St. Jacob received a sea passport (sø-pas) for sailing to the East Indies, and on 19 October, the ships departed from Denmark. On board St. Anna was the governor of Tranquebar, Roland Crappé, while his successor, Bernt Pessart, was aboard St. Jacob. The ships transported goods valued at 17,000 Danish rigsdaler and had an additional 33,000 Danish rigsdaler in liquid capital.

==== Voyages to Makassar ====
The ships arrived at Tranquebar on 2 and 3 September 1636, and St. Jacob quickly became involved in the intra-Asian trade. Already in 1636, St. Jacob, together with Charitas, initiated a voyage to Makassar on Celebes.

In 1640, St. Jacob initiated a voyage to Makassar and other places on the Sunda Islands. After a successful voyage to the port of Bantam, St. Jacob went to Makassar. Here, it received a delegation from the sultan of Makassar, Malikussaid, consisting of the Mullah, Mumin, his entourage of 50 men, and valuable goods. St. Jacob now initiated a return voyage to Masulipatnam with a valuable cargo.

== Grounding ==
=== Trying to save St. Jacob ===
However, during its voyage, St. Jacob got caught in a storm and was driven towards the coast of Bengal in present-day Odisha. Here, the ship got in danger of grounding, and the crew tried to save the ship by lowering its two anchors off Pipli, though the hawsers snapped, and the anchors were consequently lost. Afterwards, cannons were used in the anchors' place, although to no avail.

=== Local interference ===
Meanwhile, at Pipli's shore, some merchants from Masulipatnam offered to assist St. Jacob, which Danish author Asta Bredsdorff asserts could have saved the ship. However, the local Mughal faujdar, Hadi Gayas, denied the ship any assistance and denied it access to enter Pipli's port. Instead, he set up a tent on the coast to watch the ship ground, when it became clear that this would be the ship's destiny. Subsequently, St. Jacob was smashed to pieces in the surf zone, and whatever cargo washed ashore was thereafter seized by Gayas (Note: According to contemporary Mughal legislation, it was permissible for a local Nawab to seize a ship at sea with no crew.) as flotsam.

=== Casualties and fate of the survivors ===
27 men died as a result of the grounding, and none of the cargo, which consisted of pepper, was recovered. The majority of the Danish crew survived and, after exhausting efforts, managed to reach the coast, where they were sheltered by the Mughal government in a nearby house. Here, they were offered lots of food and water, to which they soon after got sick and claimed their food had been poisoned by Gayas. In any case, 16 men died (Note: According to German historian Stephan Diller, these 16 men died in connection with the grounding.) within 3 days.

==== Escaping Danes ====
The captain of St. Jacob, Nicolaj Samson, managed to escape and later reached Tranquebar in a boat after many difficulties. According to Asta Bredsdorff, this is the only information known about the Danish survivors. Although, according to Danish colonial historian Kay Larsen, it is possible that a couple of others escaped too. This possibility is given as a fact by American historian of Southeast Asia, Kathryn Wellen.

==== Makassarese delegation ====
Meanwhile, Mullah Mumin died in Bengal, and his properties were too, either destroyed or seized by the Mughal government. Meanwhile, his entourage was imprisoned and transported to Medinapur, and the Danish factory at Balasore was forced to give 3,000 rupees to the local Mughal Nawab, Siaraskhan, for their release, which eventually happened.

== Aftermath ==
=== Estimated losses ===
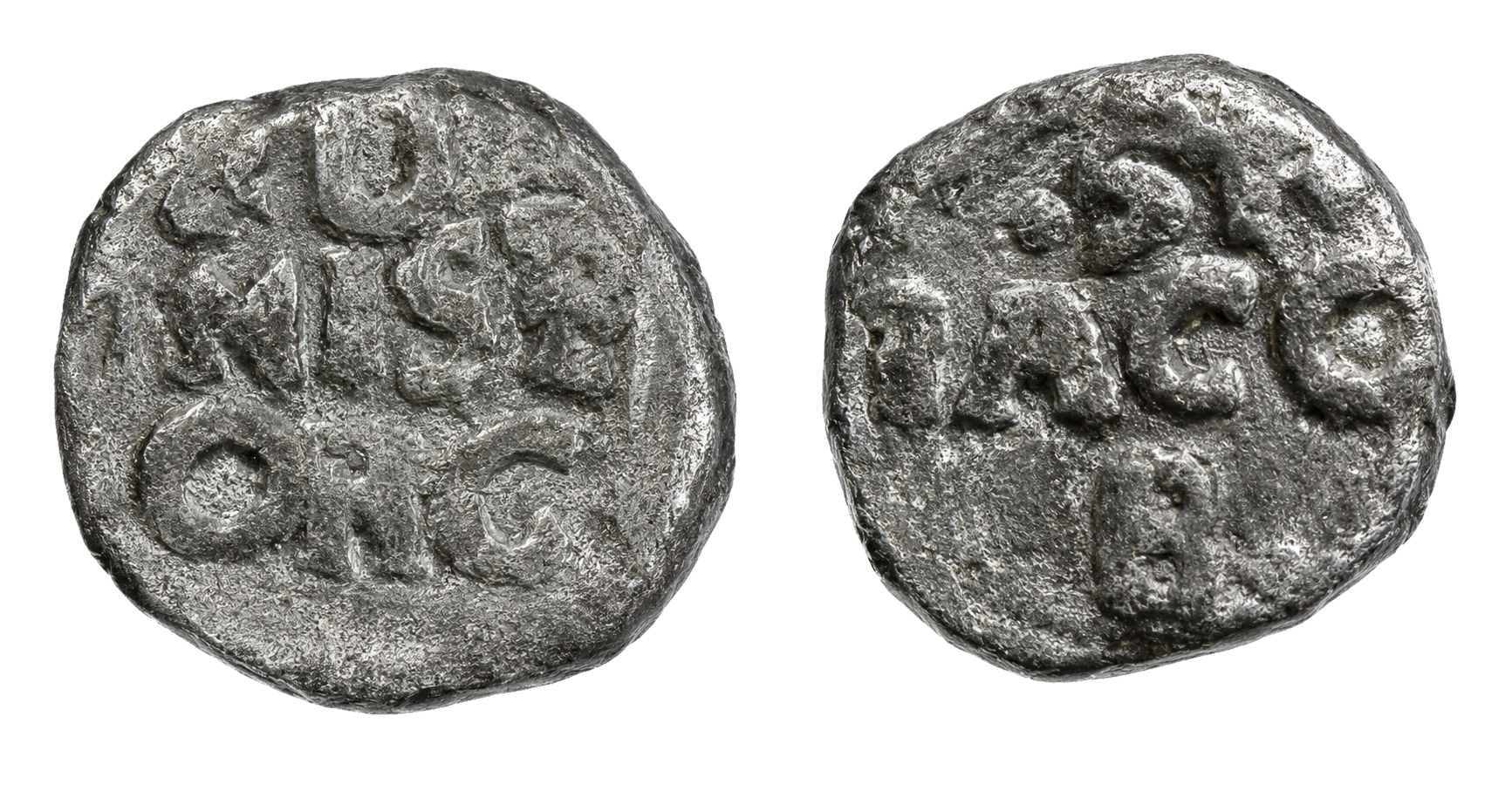
A coin with the inscription DANISBORG-ST. IACOB, which presumably refers to St. Jacob. It is one of the earliest known Danish coins recovered from a shipwreck

Bernt Pessart estimated the cargo on the ship at 150,000 Danish rigsdaler, although historians put this at 70,000 Danish rigsdaler. The loss of the ship itself, including the cannons, was estimated at 20,000 or 25,000 Danish rigsdaler. Additionally, the Makassarese losses totalled 70,000 Danish rigsdaler, which Sultan Malikassaid demanding that the Danes pay. (Note: Despite the Danes paying the ransom for his delegation's release, the sultan of Makassar, Malikussaid, was not satisfied and blamed the Danes for the damages.)

=== Economic consequences ===
The grounding of St. Jacob was a severe blow for the D.E.I.C., and the incident, together with Mirza Mumin's assault on the Danish factory at Pipli, had wideranging consequences: The ship's cargo was indispensable for the Danish factory in Masulipatnam, as it was to repay the debts from merchants in the city; nevertheless, these debts could now not be repaid, which left the Danish factory in such a comprehensive embarrassment that the Danes had to abandon it. Additionally, the creditors in Masulipatnam demanded that Pessart be imprisoned.

==== Casus belli for the Dano-Mughal War ====
Although Dutch records suggest that St. Jacob's cargo was seized because of Danish debts, the Danes viewed the seizure as a tyrannical act and the behavior of Hadi Gayas as robbery. The Danes consequently saw it as reasonable to demand the unpaid compensation, and did so for both the cargo and ship; however, the losses were hard to replace, and the demands were never met, as the Danes could not negotiate the return of the remaining cargo. According to German historian Stephan Diller, the Danish demands for compensation were highly excessive and were merely intended to save the D.E.I.C. from its economic difficulties. Nevertheless, as the demands could not be fulfilled, the Danes were now forced to use extreme means. Accordingly, in 1642, Pessart declared war on the Mughal Empire, which was indirectly attributed to Siaraskhan. As such, the grounding of St. Jacob has been seen by historians as the immediate casus belli for the Dano-Mughal War.

==== Later demands for compensation ====
Danish demands for compensation continued afterwards: already a couple of years after, in 1644, the new governor of Tranquebar, Willem Leyel, launched his privateering campaign against the Mughal Empire with compensation from hostile Mughal actions as the primary goal for the campaign. Consequently, the grounding of St. Jacob, particularly the poisoning of the surviving Danish crew, was mentioned in his manifesto justifying the war. Continuing later upon the creation of the Second Danish East India Company in 1670, King Christian V of Denmark sent a letter to the Mughal Empire, requesting compensation for Mughal seizures, including that of St. Jacob.

== See also ==
- Grounding of the Jupiter – 1625 grounding of a Danish ship
- Grounding of the Nattergalen – 1626 grounding of a Danish ship
- Action off Pipli River – 1644 Dano-Mughal War confrontation

== Notes and citations ==
=== Works cited ===
- Larsen, Kay (1908). De dansk-ostindiske koloniers historie – De Bengalske loger & Nikobarerne [History of the Danish East Indian Colonies – The Bengali Lodges & the Nicobar Islands] (in Danish). Vol. 2. Copenhagen, Denmark: Centralforlaget – via Danskernes Historie Online.
- Larsen, Kay (1935). Ipsen, Poul (ed.). "En lille dansk Søkrig i Indien" [A Little Danish Naval War] (PDF). Tidsskrift for Søvæsen. 106. Copenhagen, Denmark: Søe-Lieutenant-Selskabet – via Marinehistorisk Selskab.
- Bredsdorff, Asta (1 January 1999). Willem Leyels liv og farefulde rejse til Indien [The Trials and Travels of Willem Leyel] (PDF). Søhistoriske Skrifter. Vol. 21. Copenhagen, Denmark: Museum Tusculanum Press. ISBN 87-7289-498-9. ISSN 0107-6647.
- Wellen, Kathryn (2015). "The Danish East India Company's War against the Mughal Empire, 1642-1698" (PDF). Journal of Early Modern History. 19 (5). Leiden, the Netherlands: Brill Publishers: 439–461. doi:10.1163/15700658-12342470. eISSN 1568-5209. ISSN 0022-4995.
- Larsen, Kay (September 1907). Munch, Peter Rochegune (ed.). "Danske Kapertogter i den bengalske Havbugt" [Danish Privateer Voyages in the Bay of Bengal]. Det ny Aarhunderede. 4. Copenhagen, Denmark: Harvard Library – via Internet Archive.
- Bonefeld, Olav Jørgen (1977). Henningsen, Henning; Poulsen, Hanne (eds.). "Skibsnavne på blymønter fra Trankebar" [Ship names on lead coins from Tranquebar] (PDF). Handels- og Søfartsmuseet på Kronborg (in Danish). 36. Helsingør, Denmark: Selskabet Handels- og Søfartsmuseets Venner – via Danskernes Historie Online.
- Diller, Stephan (1 June 1999). Die Dänen in Indien, Südostasien und China (1620-1845) [The Danes in India, Southeast Asia and China (1620–1845)]. South China and Maritime Asia (in German). Vol. 8. Wiesbaden, Germany: Harrassowitz Verlag. ISBN 978-3-447-04123-2. ISSN 0945-9286.
- Krieger, Martin [in German] (7 June 2008). "Danish Shipping and Trade between Tranquebar on the Coromandel Coast of India and South East Asia during the Seventeenth and Eighteenth Centuries". In Stephen, S. Jeyaseela (ed.). The Indian Trade at the Asian Frontier (1st ed.). New Delhi: Gyan Publishing House. ISBN 978-8121209465.
