= Subarnarekha =

Subarnarekha may refer to:

- Subarnarekha River, West Bengal, India
  - Subarnarekha port, port in Odisha, India
- Subarnarekha (1962 film), an Indian Bengali-language film directed by Ritwik Ghatak
