= Susantha Goonatilake =

Sri Lankan academic, sociologist, and Professor

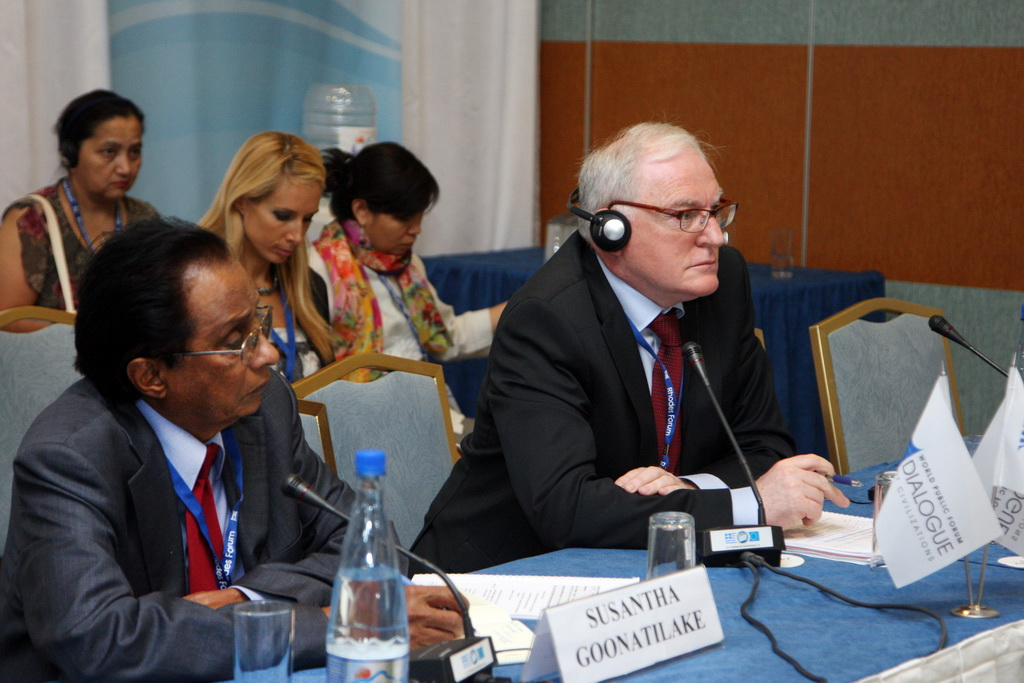
- Goonatilake (left) with an other speaker at World Public Forum "Dialogue of Civilizations" in 2012
- Born: British Ceylon
- Citizenship: Sri Lankan
- Occupation: Anthropologist
- Spouse: Hema Goonatilake

Academic background
- Education: University of Colombo (BSc); University of Exeter (MA) and (PhD); Royal College Colombo
- Alma mater: University of Exeter
- Thesis: Organisational forms in post-traditional society with special reference to South Asia (1973)

Academic work
- Discipline: Anthropology; Sociology; Science studies
- Sub-discipline: Cultural history; global shifts in culture and science
- Institutions: University of Exeter; New School for Social Research

Susantha Goonatilake (Sinhala: සුසන්ත ගුණතිලක) is a Sri Lankan academic, sociologist, and professor of anthropology at the University of Exeter, Columbia University, and New School for Social Research. He was the president of the Royal Asiatic Society of Sri Lanka (the "RASSL"), and before that the president of the Sri Lanka Association for the Advancement of Science.

== Early life and academic career ==
Born in Sri Lanka during British colonization, when it was still known as British Ceylon, Susantha Goonatilake was educated at the Royal College, Colombo. Thereafter he went on to gain his BSc in engineering from the University of Colombo in 1961. After Goonatilake received electrical engineering training in the United Kingdom and Germany. He went on to gain his MSc and PhD in industrial sociology from the University of Exeter in 1971 (Master thesis: A study of the authority structure of an industrial organisation in a transitional setting: case study of a Ceylon industrial plant) and 1973 (PhD thesis: Organisational forms in post-traditional society with special reference to South Asia) respectively. He was the first trained in electrical engineering in Sri Lanka.

Goonatilake was a professor at the University of Exeter, Columbia University and New School for Social Research, president of the Sri Lanka Association for the Advancement of Science and he was president of the Royal Asiatic Society of Sri Lanka from 2009 to 2015. He is a Fellow of the World Academy of Arts and Sciences.

Susantha Goonatilake is the husband of Buddhist scholar Dr. Hema Goonatilake and father of the Sri Lankan entrepreneur Suran Goonatilake, OBE.

== Publications ==
Among Goonatilake's publications are;

- Food as a Human Right, Tokyo, ed. The United Nations University, 1982.
- Crippled Minds: an Exploration into Colonial Culture, New Delhi, Vikas Publishers, 1982.
- Aborted Discovery: Science and Creativity in the Third World. London, Zed Press, 1984.
- Jiritsu Suru Ajia No Kagaku-Dai San Sekai Ishiki Karano Kaiho, Tokyo, Ochanomizu Shobo Publishers, 1990 (In English: A Free Asian Science -Towards Liberation of the Third World Mind; it is a Japanese translation of writings on non-European knowledge systems)
- Evolution of Information: Lineages in Genes, Culture and Artefact, London, Pinter Publishers, 1992.
- Technological Independence: the Asian Experience, Tokyo, ed. the United Nations University 1993.
- Merged Evolution: the Long Term Implications of Information Technology and Biotechnology. New York, Gordon & Breach, 1999.
- Toward a Global Science: Mining Civilizational Knowledge, Indiana University Press 1999.
- Anthropologizing Sri Lanka: A Civilizational Misadventure, Indiana University Press, 2001.
- Recolonisation: Foreign Funded NGOs in Sri Lanka, Sage, 2006.
- A 16th Century Clash of Civilizations: The Portuguese Presence in Sri Lanka, Vijitha Yapa Publications, 2010.
