= Entourage (Entourage episode) =

- Entourage episode
- Vince and Eric talking at the premiere of Head On
- Episode no.: Season 1 Episode 1
- Directed by: David Frankel
- Written by: Doug Ellin
- Original air date: July 18, 2004
- Running time: 29 minutes

Guest appearances
- Mark Wahlberg as himself; Ali Larter as herself

Episode chronology
← Previous —	Next → "The Review"

"Entourage" is the pilot episode of the American comedy-drama television series of the same name. Written by Doug Ellin, and directed by David Frankel, it originally aired on HBO in the United States on July 18, 2004. It received positive reviews and was nominated for the Primetime Emmy Award for Outstanding Directing for a Comedy Series.

== Plot ==
The episode opens with Turtle walking into a restaurant, greeting every female by name as he goes. When he meets up with the group, he tells Vince to sign a poster for Head On (Vince's new movie co-starring Jessica Alba). When asked why, Turtle explains that it's for the girl who hooks the group up with all of their Nike shoes. The group then engages in a discussion of how bad promo photos can sink an actor's career, until two extremely attractive females walk by and Turtle starts to harass them. After the girls leave, the group discusses whether or not they should attend their high school reunion back in New York City, and their disapproval of Eric's on again / off again girlfriend Kristen.

Next the guys head to the premiere of Head On, where Johnny "Drama" tries to get out of the limo before Vince. As the guys walk up the red carpet and comment on the girls in attendance, Eric tells Turtle to go and make sure that Ali Larter is not sitting within ten rows of Vince. When Vince has a reporter take his picture with his brother Drama, the photographer can't place where he knows Drama from. When Eric tells Vince to go take a picture with Alan, Vince is unsure of who that is, and Eric has to remind him that Alan is the man who financed Head On. While Vince takes the pictures, Ari starts harassing Eric to get Vince to read the script for Matterhorn, a buddy cop type movie set in Disneyland. Ari promises court side Los Angeles Lakers tickets if Eric gets Vince to read the script.

While they are talking, Turtle interrupts to tell "E" that he's lined up a "revenge fuck" who looks just like his ex, Kristen, and who's apparently told Turtle that she "puts out". As Turtle describes the girl, Ali Larter comes over and looks very annoyed, and then proceeds to aggressively quiz Eric on Vince's whereabouts. We are left to assume that there was a relationship that went sour between Vince and Ali.

After the premiere the guys head back to their house with some girls in tow for a pool party. The guys spend time trying to get with each girl. The next morning Drama and Turtle pester Eric with tales of how the girls they ended up with the night before performed in bed, and try to get Eric to talk about how his was. When Vince comes down, Eric asks Vince if he's read the script for Matterhorn yet. Vince says no, and asks E what he thought of it. When Eric says he thought it sucked, Vince says "OK. I trust you", then explains how he never read the script for Head On and didn't know who the killer was until he saw the film the night before.

The guys then take a trip to the Warner Brothers studio to meet with the director for Matterhorn. On the way, Turtle tells the guys about Arnold the rottweiler he is getting for Vince from Black Hack. As they walk into the studio, we learn that Drama is Vince's half-brother and that Vince and Turtle originally moved to Hollywood to follow Johnny around. Just before they walk in, the guys exchange greetings with Mark Wahlberg.

When the guys get back home, they discuss the meeting with the director, and Ari calls to tell Vince that the director loved him and wants to sign him to do Matterhorn for $4 million. Vince asks Eric what he thinks, and E tells him he thinks it's time Vince read the script. While Vince struggles to read the script, the guys hit golf balls into the neighborhood, trying to hit the homes of other actors, such as Pierce Brosnan. After a while the guys switch from golf to basketball while Vince finishes reading the script. After reading it, he still has the same opinion, that is Eric was right and the script sucks but the $4 million would be sweet.

When Ari calls, Vince tells him what Eric thinks of the script but Ari doesn't care. Vince, however, values Eric's opinion and tells Ari to talk to E about it (even though E wants to talk to Ari even less than Ari wants to talk to E). Ari decides to have dinner with Eric to discuss Vince's future. Vince likes this as now he won't always have to "be in the middle of things". The dog arrives but the guys are too afraid to take it out of the cage so they have Turtle dress up in full hockey gear as they open the cage from the second story of the house via a draw string.

At dinner Eric and Ari spar with verbal insults and discuss why Eric doesn't think that Vince should do Matterhorn. Eric threatens to slap Ari if he ever insults him again and we learn that two years prior Vince couldn't get a call back from Ari. After dinner Eric passes out watching SportsCenter, and Turtle and Drama wake him up to get ready to go to Las Vegas. Eric doesn't want to go so they tell him that his ex-girlfriend Kristen is sleeping with Vince Vaughn. Eric believes them at first then realizes (thanks to Drama's overacting) that they are lying to him.

Vince enters the room and takes Eric aside to find out why he threatened Ari and tells him he can't do that. Eric explains that Ari was being condescending (in particular deriding his former role as a manager at Sbarro), so Vince asks if Eric thinks he should fire Ari. Eric sarcastically says yes and Vince begins to make the call. When Eric sees this, he stops him and Vince tells E he wants him to make his decisions. From this point, Eric is now his unofficial manager. After this, Vince and E decide not to go to Vegas. Vince also wants to skip the reunion but Eric is looking forward to it and wants to go and convinces Vince go as well.

The next day, the guys are getting ready to head to the airport and Eric asks Turtle if he got the Bose headsets. Turtle has no clue what E is talking about, and Eric berates him to go get them. After Turtle gets in the car, Vince asks Eric what that was about as he didn't ask for any headsets. Eric points at the car and says "you also don't want to ride in a car that has that on it". As Turtle drives off we see a bumper sticker on the back of the car that reads "I ♥ Cock", as E reminds Drama that he's next. Ari calls again and Vince hands the phone to E. Eric answers and Ari asks for Vince. E tells him Vince wants them to talk instead. Ari then tells him that Colin Farrell took Matterhorn. When Eric breaks the word to Vince he says, "I hope you know what you're doing, pizza boy."

== Production ==
The pilot was written by series creator Doug Ellin and directed by David Frankel. On reading the script, Frankel was concerned that Ferrara was too young for the role of Turtle, Dillon was too old to play Drama, and Grenier was very unlike Wahlberg/Vince. Furthermore, Connolly was ambivalent about his part. However, Frankel was impressed by the group once all together and felt that Connolly's sincerity boosted the show. Ellin's first version of the script had the show beginning at the movie premiere, with no-one liking Vince's acting but none willing to tell him. HBO executives rejected this version, and urged Ellin to make it more upbeat.

Mark Wahlberg's entourage in this episode includes the real life Turtle, Eric, and Johnny.

== Reception ==
The pilot was initially broadcast on July 18, 2004, in the United States on HBO.

Phil Gallo of Variety was critical of the episode, citing what he perceived as a lack of subtext and bland characters. However, he praised Piven's giving Ari Gold "an intensity and a moral void that gets better with each episode", and foreshadowed what he saw as better writing by episode 3. Conversely, Tim Goodman of the San Francisco Chronicle cited the show's and characters' soullessness as reasons the show is entertaining. Ken Tucker of Entertainment Weekly gave the episode an A−, describing it as "excellent, dirty fun", praising the casting, in particular Dillon and Piven.

Frankel received a 2005 Emmy nomination for Outstanding Directing for a Comedy Series for his work on this episode.

== Music credits ==
- "Bang Bang Boom" by Drag-On
- "Grown Man Sport" by INI
- "Rocky Mountain Way" by Joe Walsh
- "Eminence Front" by The Who
- "Hey Ya!" by OutKast
- "Hey Mama" by Black Eyed Peas
- "Fire (Yes, Yes Y'all)" by Joe Budden
- "Wanna Get to Know You" by G Unit
- "Oooh." by De La Soul feat. Redman
- "Barely Holding On" by Sean Anthony
- "Cold Hard Bitch" by Jet
- "Lucifer" by Jay-Z
