= Talasari Beach =

Beach in Odisha, India

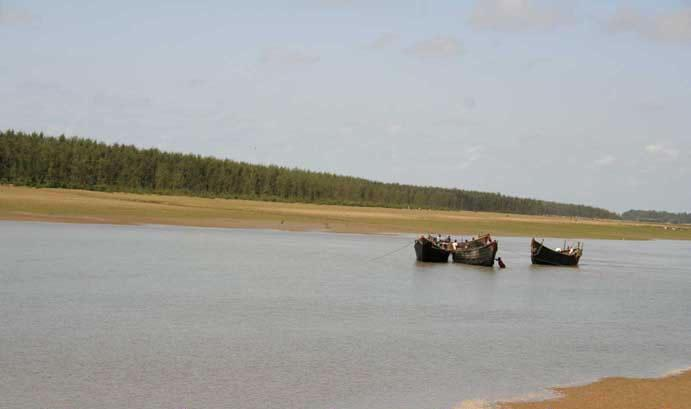
- Talasari Beach

- Location within India Location within Odisha
- Coordinates: 21.605°N 87.466°E
- Location: Balasore, Odisha
- Part of: Eastern coastline

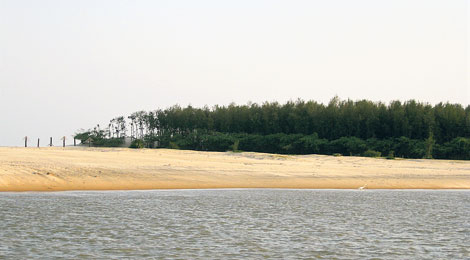
Palm trees lined in a row along the beach

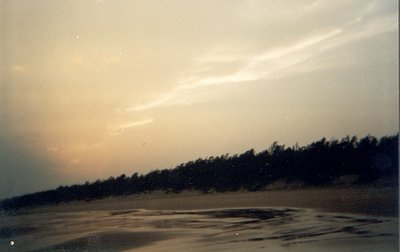
A view of the beach during the sunset

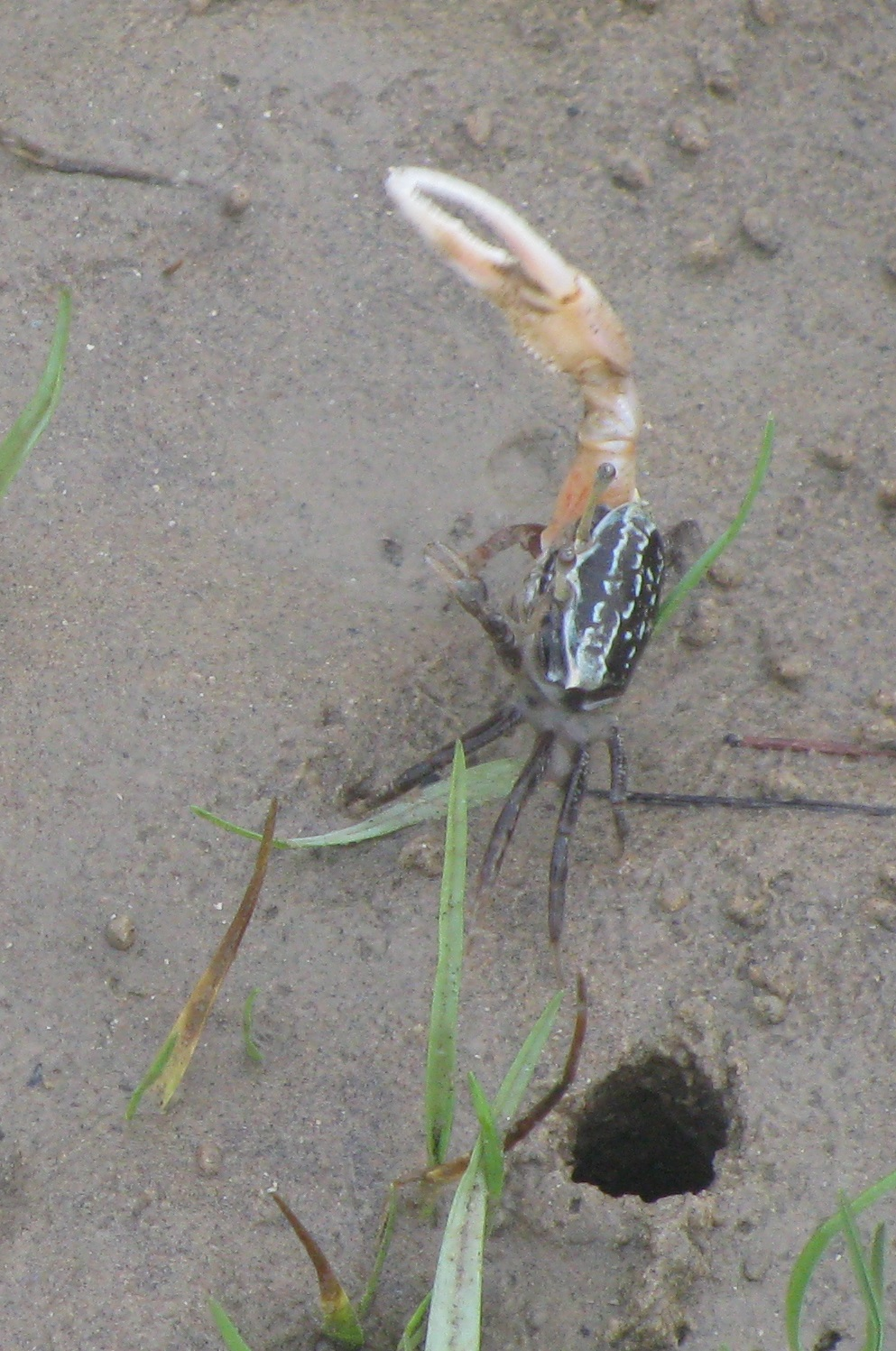
Porcelain Fiddler Crab taken at Talsari during the low tide on the Subarnarekha river

Talasari Beach is a beach in the Baleswar district of Odisha, India. It lies on the north-eastern coast of India.

The name Talasari is derived from the two Odia words Tala (ତାଳ) (meaning Palm) and Sari/Sarani (ସାରି/ସାରଣୀ) (meaning row). The palm trees surrounding the place give such a name to it. The word Tala also means rhythm, which is reflected in the sea waves lapping against the shore.

The Subarnarekha river adds to the visual appeal of the Talasari beach. Other attractions include the sand dunes and red crabs on the beach and the fishing hamlets and the mangrove trees of Bichitrapur nearby.

== Overview ==
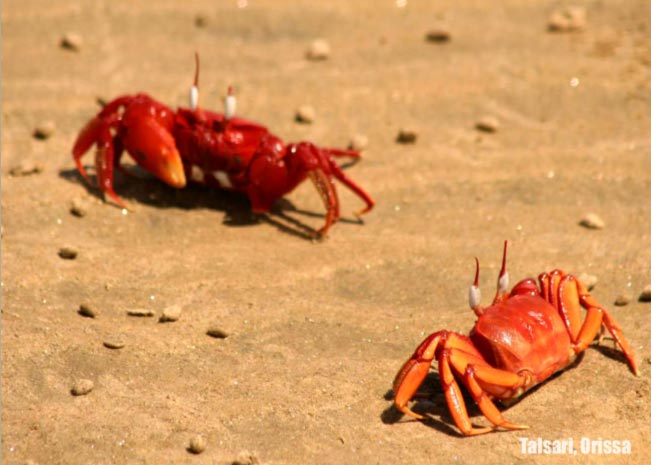
Red crabs on Talsari beach, Odisha.

The place has vast stretches of green paddy fields, numerous rivers, blue hills and extensive beaches. The beach has tall coconut trees, palm trees and casuarina. Udaipur beach is the last beach on this stretch.

When the stream is brimming, one can only reach the main beach with the help of a boat. But at other times, one can walk across the dry riverbed. The place is fairly windy.

Talasari is one of the less exploited Odisha beaches. The Talsari beach is not as frequently visited by the people as the other beaches of Odisha. The waters of the sea at Talsari beach are not turbulent but calm and peaceful.

It is the last beach in the Odisha to the north.

== Geography ==
Talsari's beach is famous for its fishing village, and among people partial to seafood. Digha Beach is 7 km away.

== Climate ==
The place receives 156.84 cm rainfall throughout the year. During the summer, the temperature is high and sometimes reaches 40 °C. During the winter, the mercury stands around 14 °C.

== Transport ==
In Odisha, Talasari is 36 km from Jaleswar, is the nearest railway station and Kolkata is the nearest airport and is 180 km from Talsari. It's also well connected to Baleswar. However, from West Bengal side, Talsari is only 8–10 km away from Digha. Recently two trains have been launched from Howrah to New Digha. In a motor vehicle, it takes around 15 minutes from the Digha railway station to Talasari.

== Attractions ==
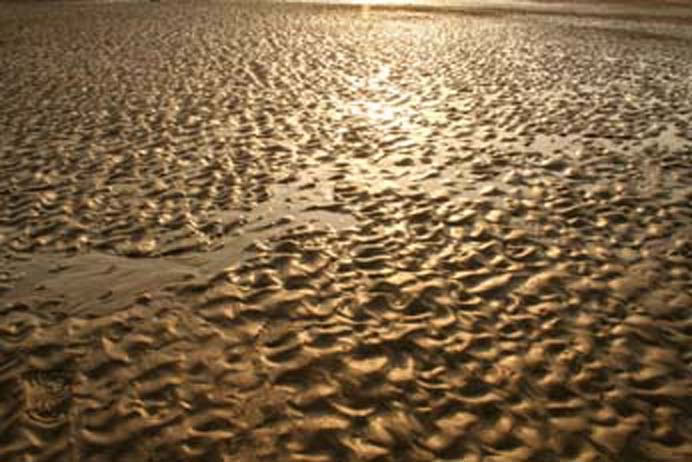
Dunes along the beach

In February, red and orange flowers appear on the cashew trees. The cashew kernel hangs outside the fruit, which is also edible.

There are a handful of small hotels and a Panthasala run by the Odisha government.

The beach is quite flat and the waves are small and playful. The estuary of the river Subarnarekha River can be seen in the distance.

A quay has been made on the beach that serves as a fish market in the morning.
