= Daniel Gogerly =

British missionary and scholar (1792–1862)

Daniel John Gogerly
- Born: 25 August 1792; London, England
- Died: 6 September 1862 (aged 70); Colombo, Ceylon
- Occupation: missionary
- Years active: 1818–1862
- Notable work: Dictionary of the Pali Language; The Kristiyani Prajnapti, Part 1, on Buddhism : Or the Evidences and Doctrines of the Christian Religion
- Spouses: Sarah née Kenegan; Anna Joanna Susanna née van Lynden; Eliza Jane née Torriano; Anna Deborah née McCally
- Children: Daniel, Elizabeth

Daniel John Gogerly (25 August 1792 – 6 September 1862) was a British Wesleyan Methodist missionary and scholar, who served in Ceylon and provided one of the first translations of the Pāli text into English.

Daniel John Gogerly was born in London on 25 August 1792, the second of two children (and the first son) of Daniel Gogerly and Elizabeth. In 1806, at age fourteen he joined the Wesleyan Methodist Society, where at an early age he became a preacher. Gogerly became an apprentice printer and came to the attention of Richard Watson who convinced him to join the staff of the newly formed "Mission to Asia". On 19 January 1817 he married Sarah née Kenegan and on the 17 May 1818 he left England arriving in Jaffna in October 1818 an un-ordained Wesleyan missionary, following which he traveled to Colombo to take charge of the Wesleyan Mission Press there. On 20 September 1821 his wife Sarah died in Madras. The following year he entered the regular missionary service, and was one of the first missionaries to preach in Singhalese. On 18 September 1822 he married Anna Joanna Susanna née van Lynden, the widow of Jean Guillaume, with whom he had two children, Daniel (b. 1827) and Elizabeth (b. 1825). From 1822 to 1834 he was stationed at Negombo, where he devoted himself to the study of the languages of the country, especially Pāli, becoming the first European to undertake a critical/scientific study of that dialect.

On 9 November 1829 his wife Anna died in Colombo. Gogerly then married Eliza Jane née Torriano on 6 July 1830, at Cotta however they had no offspring. He subsequently married Anna Deborah née McCally, the widow of Rev. James Chater.

Gogerly's publications, mainly essays and translations were published in a number of local periodicals, including the Journal of the Ceylon Branch of the Royal Asiatic Society, of which he served as the Secretary, vice-president, and President (1858). His Dictionary of the Pali Language, which he began to compile during his stay in Matara in 1834, is considered to be his greatest literary contribution. In 1840 he printed the first English translation of Dhammapada, comprising verses 1–255.

Gogerly's scholarly work was however not motivated by a sympathetic attitude to Buddhist teachings but rather he undertook the translations in order to provide evidence demonstrating the superiority of Christianity.

In 1838 Gogerly was appointed as the chairman of the Wesleyan Mission in Ceylon, and afterwards the Mission's general superintendent. The colonial government subsequently appointed Gogerly to the Central School Commission of Ceylon

Gogerly died at the Wesleyan Mission House, Kollupitiya, on 6 September 1862.

Renowned Buddhist scholar, Thomas Rhys Davids, acknowledged Gogerly as the "greatest Pali scholar of his age".
