= Entourage =

An entourage (French pronunciation: [ɑ̃tuʁaʒ]) is an informal group or band of people who are closely associated with a (usually) famous, notorious, or otherwise notable individual. The word can also refer to:

== Arts and entertainment ==
- L'entourage, French hip hop / rap collective
- "Entourage" (song), a 2006 single from Omarion
- Entourage (American TV series), a 2004 HBO series
  - "Entourage" (episode), the pilot episode of the American comedy-drama television series Entourage
- Entourage (film), a 2015 film adaptation of the HBO television series
- Entourage (South Korean TV series), a 2016 South Korean TV series and remake of the American series.
- The Entourage Music and Theater Ensemble, an ambient music group

== Technology and computing ==
- Microsoft Entourage, a personal information manager introduced in Office 2001, a version of Microsoft Office developed for Mac OS operating system
- enTourage eDGe, dual panel personal device

== Other uses ==
- Entourage (topology), a term used in the mathematical field of topology
- Hyundai Entourage, a minivan built by Hyundai Motor Company
- Entourage effect, the simultaneous synergetic effect of multiple cannabinoids and terpenes in Cannabis
