= Pipli =

Historical port in Odisha, India

- Pipilipattan (Odia)
- Pipely
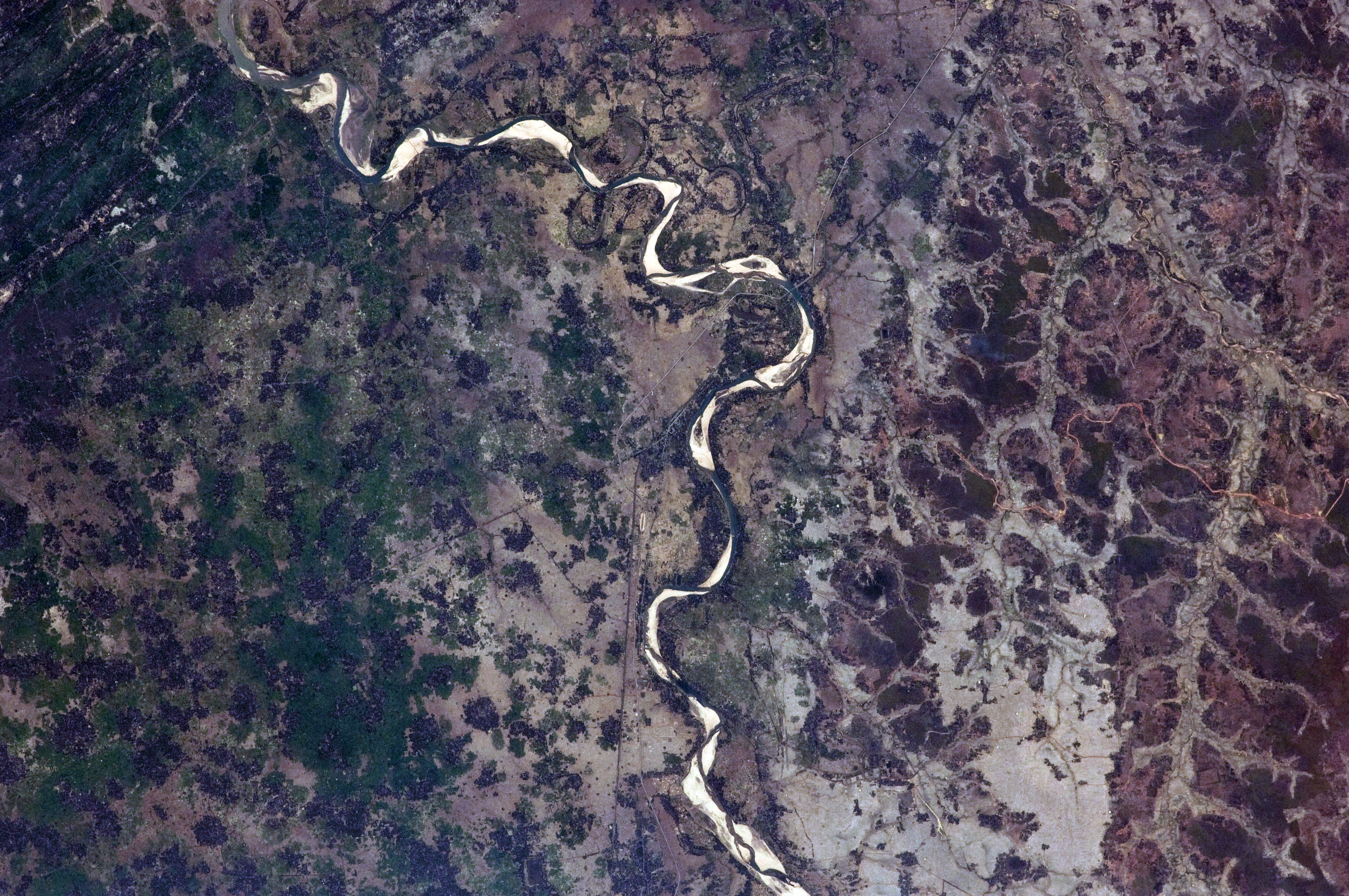
- Satellite imagery of the Subarnarekha River

- Location of the site in India
- 21°33′51″N 87°20′11″E
- Type: Port city
- Location: Near present-day Kirtania Port, Odisha, India

History
- Abandoned: 19th century

Pipli (Odia: Pipilipattan), also spelled Pipely, was a major port town at the river mouth of the Subarnarekha River during the colonization of India.

It hosted major European factories and was a great center of commerce in the 17th century. However, due to siltation, it lost its importance, as ships were unable to anchor there.

== History ==
=== Pre-European history ===
Prior to the European presence, Pipli was a trade center for Indian merchants, who traded extensively with the Malayo-Indonesian islands. As such, in the 15th century, Malacca's supply of textiles partially came from Pipli.

In the 16th century, Indian merchants from Pipli travelled as far as Banten, Pegu, Tenasserim, and Achin, and even to the Red Sea ports of Aden and Jeddah.

=== European presence ===
Following the Mughal conquest of Odisha in 1593, Pipli's importance grew, bringing it into direct contact with European traders.

==== Portuguese ====
The Portuguese became the first Europeans, establishing their first factory there in 1514, giving them a monopoly for more than one hundred years, between 1514 and 1615. This made Pipli a great center of Portuguese trade, being mentioned in 1633 as the old rendezvous of the Portuguese. This was exacerbated in the early 17th century, when the Portuguese repositioned their trade from San Thomé to Pipli. Here, they bought many kinds of white cotton, textiles, gingelly (sesame), butter, and other commodities, shipping them to Macao.

In 1636, the Portuguese obtained permission from the Nawab of Odisha, Mutaqad Khan, to establish an additional residence in the city; however, they had to abandon the port in the latter half of the 17th century.

==== Dutch ====
The Dutch ended the Portuguese monopoly with their arrival at Pipli; however, the date of their arrival is disputed. Despite it traditionally being dated to 1625, modern research shows that their arrival took place in 1627. Nonetheless, in 1637, the Dutch withdrew their trade from Hooghly to here, where they obtained permission to trade from the Mughal emperor, Shah Jahan. Subsequently, the Dutch trade profited from their factory, where the Dutch shipped 2,000 tonnes (2,200 short tons) of saltpeter annually in the 1650s. Despite this, the Dutch abandoned their factory in the city in 1676, destroying it along the way.

==== English ====
Like the Dutch and later the French, the English also entered Pipli for maritime trade. In July 1631, an English voyage to Pipli was undertaken to open trade there. The English factory there continued until 1723. At the end of the 19th century, Pipli became too unprofitable for the British Raj to develop.

Apart from the abovementioned, Pipli also hosted the French and Danes. Because of the European activity, Pipli grew into an important commercial and maritime center, with Alexander Hamilton describing the city as a great center of trade in the 17th century. Meanwhile, the Indian merchants were still actively trading regionally.

The abandonment of the Europeans in the latter half of the 17th century was due to the formation of sandbanks and sediment pollution, which made the river mouth of the Subarnarekha River unsuitable for ships to anchor. Over time, this took away the commercial advantages of the port, causing the port to lose its importance. Furthermore, river flooding from the Subarnerkha River washed away the remnants of the port city.

== Notes and citations ==
=== Works cited ===
- Tripati, Sila; Unnikrishnan, Alakkat S. [in German] (10 February 2011). "Role of Cyclones and Other Factors in the Decline of the Ports of Northern Orissa" (PDF). Current Science. 100 3. Dona Paula, India – via National Institute of Oceanography.
- Tripati, Sila; Patnaik, Sunil Kumar; Acharya, Subrata Kumar (1 November 2014). "Iron Anchors of Northern Odisha, East Coast India". The Bulletin of the Australasian Institute for Maritime Archaeology. 38. S2CID 54757281.
