= Jaleswar =

- Town
- Location in Odisha, India Jaleswar (India)
- Coordinates: 21°49′N 87°13′E
- Country: India
- State: Odisha
- District: Balasore

Government
  - MLA: Aswani Patra

Population (2011)
  - Total: 25,747

Languages
  - Official: Odia
- Time zone: UTC+5:30 (IST)
- PIN: 756032
- Telephone code: 06781
- Vehicle registration: OD-01
- Sex ratio: 1000:942 ♂/♀
- Website: odisha.gov.in

Jaleswar is a town located in the Balasore district of Odisha, in India. It consists of 144 villages, with four major areas: Bada Bazar, Nua Bazar, Station Bazar, and Purana Bazar. Jaleswar is considered one of the new municipalities in the state, and Jaleswar forms a state assembly constituency along with Balipal Block.

== Demographics ==
According to the 2001 India census, the town of Jaleswar had a population of 21,382 inhabitants, 51% male and 49% female. The town has a 78% literacy rate versus a 59.5% national average. Male literacy is 83%, and female literacy is 67%. In Jaleswar, 14% of the population is under 6 years of age. According to the 2011 India census, Jaleswar had a population of 25,747 inhabitants, 52% male and 48% female. There are about 144 inhabited census villages; 30 villages have a population below 200. Jaleswar is considered one of the new municipalities in the state.

=== Languages ===
Languages spoken in Jaleswar Town (2011)
1. Odia (54.4%)
2. Bengali (39.5%)
3. Santali (3.41%)
4. Hindi (1.12%)
5. Urdu (0.72%)
6. Others (0.86%)

== Geography ==
Jaleswar is located about 8 kilometers from the West Bengal border. It is one of the major towns in the Balasore district, which is part of the state of Odisha.

== Places of interest ==
- The Chandaneswar Shiva temple is 27 km from Jaleswar. It is famous for Maha Vishuva Sankranti.also known as Uda Parba, Charaka Yatra, and Nila Parba, after the worship of Nilakanth Shiva.

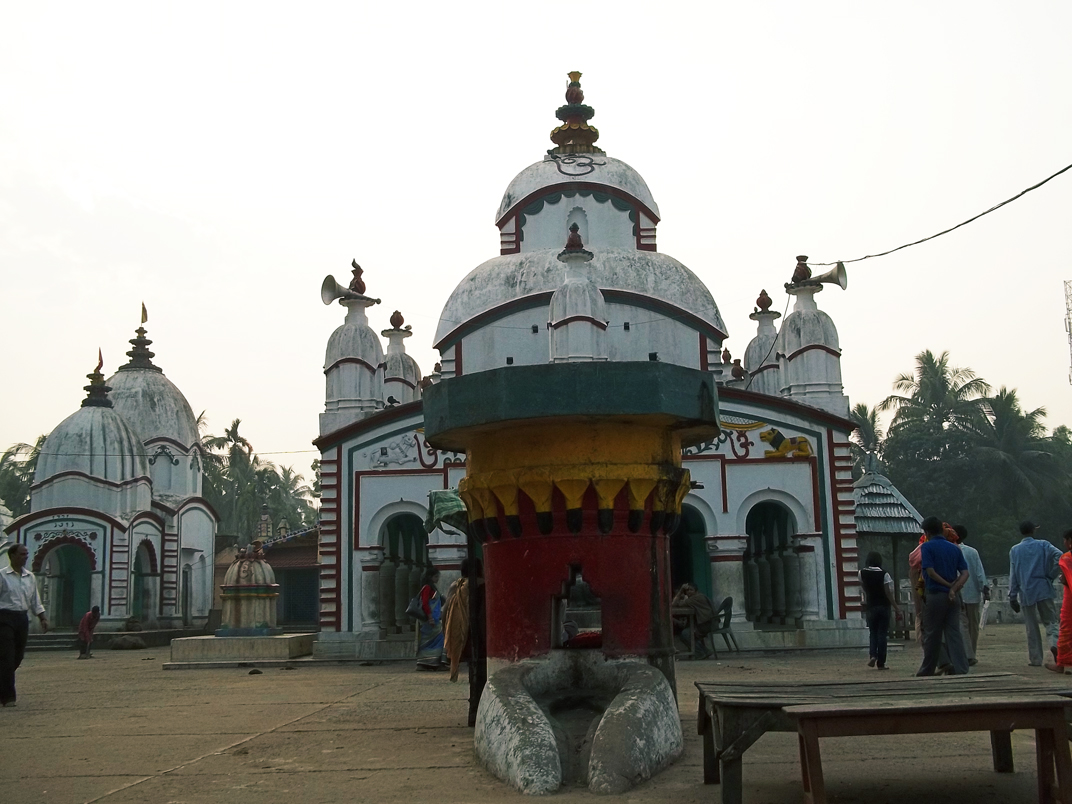
Chandaneswara temple, Chandaneswar, Jaleswar

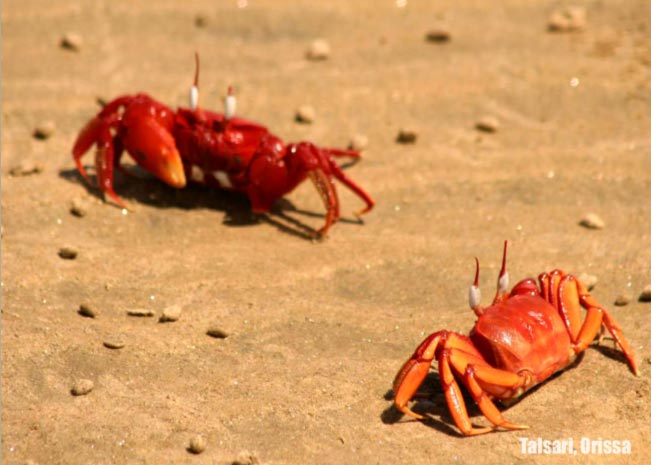
Red crabs on Talsari beach, Odisha.

- Talsari Beach is 5 km from Chandaneswar and 32 km from Jaleswar. The beach has tall coconut trees, palm trees, and casuarina.
- Laxmannath Gara is 5 km from Jaleswar. During Durga Puja, many people come to visit the gara and pray to the goddess Durga. The Subarnarekha River flows near Jaleswar.
- Raibania Gara, a historically significant site, is 14.5 km from Jaleswar.

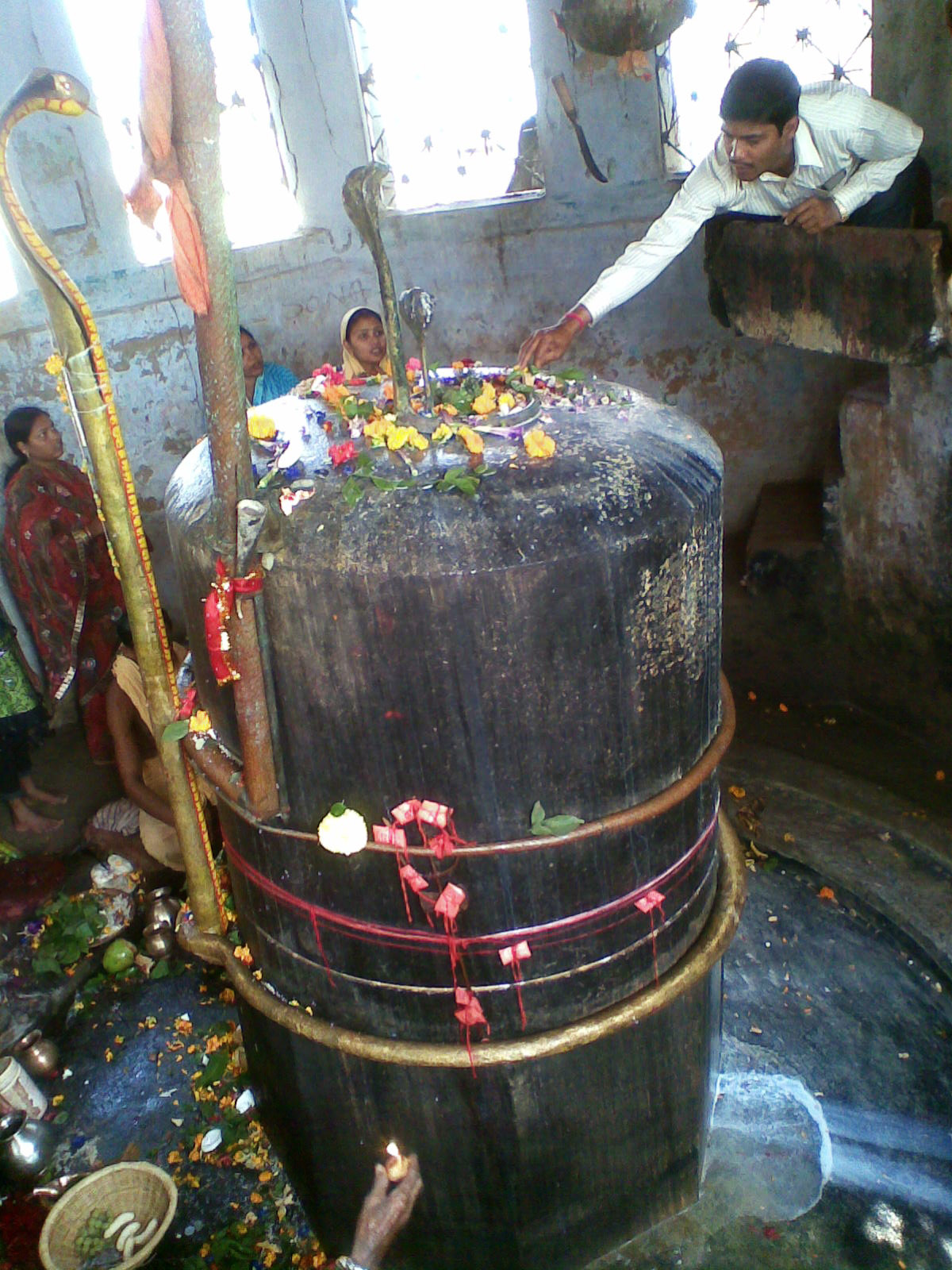
Bhusandeswara Temple

- Bhusandeswar Temple is 30 kilometers from Jaleswar. It is close to Jaleswar Station via Paschimbard. The village Paschimbard is halfway in between Jaleswar and Baliapal.
- Prayagraj Palace is 1.2 km from the main town of Jaleswar. It is situated at Nandika village.

== Culture and festivals ==
Jaleswar culture is a blend of traditional festivals and cuisine. Residents celebrate both Western and Indian festivals such as Diwali, Holi, Eid, Christmas, Navratri, Dussera, Moharram, Ganesh Chaturthi, Rath Yatra, Durga Puja, and Maha Shivratri. Major festivals are Durga Puja, Basanti Puja, and Ratha Yatra.

== Transportation ==
Jaleswar has a railway and bus service to Kolkata about 187 kilometers from the east, and Bhubaneswar about 268 kilometers from the north (the capital city of Odisha). Jaleswar is 50 km from the district headquarters of Balasore. The national highway and the southeastern railway are important transportation thoroughfares. Auto-rickshaws or tempos are the main means of transportation within and to the outskirts of the town.

== Education ==
Laksman Nath High School and Biswanath Academy Jamalpur School are the second and third oldest high schools in the Balasore district. B.N. Academy Jamalpur is located 6 km away from Jaleswar, near the Subarnarekha River. It was built in 1938 by Biswanath Parida, a leading freedom fighter. Jaleswar Women's College has been leading in terms of cutoff marks among junior arts colleges during 2013–14 and 2014–15.

== Universities and colleges ==
- Olamara Simanta (Junior) Mahavidyalaya, Olamara
- Sadhu Charan (Junior) Mahavidyalaya, Raibania
- Sitala Thakurani (Junior) College, Khuluda
- Ustab Charan Gajiani Chandi (Junior) College, Bartana
- Digambari Devi College of Science & Technology, Jaleswar
- Jaleswar Women's (Junior) College, Jaleswar
- Sri Jagannath Women's (Junior) College, Jaleswar
- IPS (Institute of Pharmaceutical Science)
- Ankit (Institute of science and technology)
