= Sean Anthony (rapper) =

Screenwriter and songwriter (born 1982)

Sean Anthony Shepard
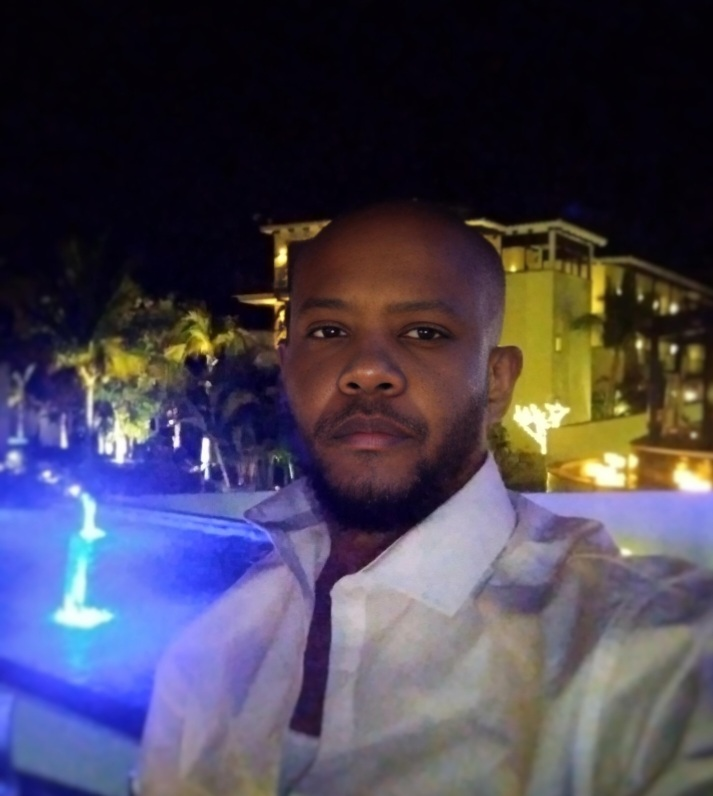

Background information
- Born: Sean Anthony Shepard; February 10, 1982 (age 44); Detroit, Michigan
- Genres: Hip Hop R&B
- Label: Island Def Jam Records/ShepTime Music Inc. Bad Boy Records

Sean Anthony Shepard, known as DJ Sean Anthony (born February 10, 1982) is an American DJ, music producer, songwriter and screenwriter.

Shepard taught himself audio production at a young age while operating his church sound room when he was brought to gospel recording artist Fred Hammond, to refine his engineering skills. Shepard became a Detroit disc jockey in the early 2000s and temporarily hosted the music video show Turbulence on WGPR-TV 62. He then branched out and started producing music and writing songs while attending college. In 2006, his demo work was presented to Mike Winans Jr. of the Winans family where he became a songwriter for Baby Mike Music under a publishing deal with Sean Combs's Bad Boy Records, where he released his first production work for Bad Boy recording artist Danity Kane on their self-titled album with tracks "Ain't True" and "Press Pause".

A year later Shepard followed up with the dance song "How You Not Gonna" for Bad Boy recording artist B5's second album Don't Talk, Just Listen.

Shepard's production credits throughout the early 2000s include "What You Mean" for Capitol Records recording artist and guitarist Tony DeNiro ft. Mike Winans Jr., "Something You Wanna Try" for Def Jam Records recording artist Electrik Red, "Come Home with Me" and "What Would You Do" for Bad Boy Records recording artist singer-songwriter Mike Winans Jr., "I Can't" for Epic Records recording artist and B2K band member Raz B, and "Crazy" for Bad Boy Records recording artist singer-songwriter Shay Winans.

Shepard ventured out independently under his own record label and publishing company, ShepTime Music Inc and gained some recognition for his first single "The Strip Club Anthem". The song was pulled by Island Def Jam and later released and redistributed on August 28, 2012, worldwide, after ownership issues were resolved.

Shepard made his acting debut in the 2017 film Michigan Lockdown and in 2023 ranked top 43% on Coverfly for the NBC Writers Discover Program.
