= Royal Asiatic Society of Sri Lanka =

- Abbreviation: RASSL
- Formation: 1845
- Location: Colombo, Sri Lanka
- Coordinates: 6.911490914245002°N 79.86066327639229°E
- Website: https://www.royalasiaticsociety.lk/

The Royal Asiatic Society of Sri Lanka (RASSL) is based in Colombo, Sri Lanka. It is one of the oldest learned societies in Sri Lanka with a history of over 160 years. It was established on 7 February 1845, paralleling the Royal Asiatic Society of Great Britain and Ireland to further oriental research as the Ceylon Branch of the Royal Asiatic Society. In 1977 it was renamed the Royal Asiatic Society of Sri Lanka.

== History ==
The Society played a major role in the establishment of national institutions including the Colombo National Museum, Department of Archaeology, Department of National Archives, Department of Meteorology, Department of Statistics, the University of Ceylon, Historical Manuscripts Commission and the Sinhalese Dictionary.

It pioneered the studies on the Veddas (the aborigines of Sri Lanka), an English translation of the Mahavamsa (the Great Chronicle of Sri Lanka), Study of the Etymology of the Sinhalese Language, Research and Translation of the Dutch Archives, Maldivian Studies, Toponymy of Sri Lanka and Translations of Pali Buddhist Commentaries into Sinhala. At its early stages, its membership included the British governors of Ceylon and high civil, judicial and medical officials of the government.

The Society began admitting Ceylonese officers 1916, with the appointment of the President, Sir Ponnambalam Arunachalam followed by eminent local scholars including Sir Paul Pieris and Sir Baron Jayatilaka.

In 1984, the Society moved to the Mahaweli Centre along the Ananda Coomaraswamy Mawatha (Ananda Coomaraswamy Street).

The Society’s main academic publication is its Journal, first published in 1846 as the Journal of the Ceylon Branch of the Royal Asiatic Society. In 1988, it was renamed the Journal of the Royal Asiatic Society of Sri Lanka.

== Journal ==
The Society published the Journal of the Ceylon Branch of the Royal Asiatic Society from 1845-onwards.

== Presidents ==
Past presidents:

- 1845 John Stark (aka James Stark)
- 1846–1857: James Emerson Tennent
- 1858: Daniel John Gogerly
- 1859–1860: William Carpenter Rowe
- 1861–1864: Edward S. Creasy
- 1865–1869: J. Fraser
- 1870–1873: Amelius Beauclerk Fyers
- 1874–1877: Robert Dowson
- 1878-1881: Amelius Beauclerk Fyers
- 1882: Charles Bruce
- 1883: Hon. W.H. Ravenscroft
- 1884: Hon. John F. Dickson
- 1885-1901: R.S. Copleston
- 1902–1904: Everard im Thurn
- 1905–1908: J. Ferguson
- 1909–1912: Hugh Clifford
- 1913–1916: John Harward
- 1916: Ponnambalam Arunachalam
- 1924: Cecil Clementi
- 1926–1928: A.G.M. Fletcher
- 1929–1930: Herbert J. Stanley
- 1931: Bernard Henry Bourdillon
- 1932–1934: Paul E. Pieris
- 1935–1941: Don Baron Jayatilaka
- 1942–1948: Charles Collins
- 1949–1952: Sidney Arnold Pakeman
- 1952–1955: Paules Edward Pieris Deraniyagala
- 1956–1958: S. Paranavitana
- 1959–1961: Edmund Peiris
- 1962–1964: Richard Leslie Brohier
- 1965–1966: Garett Champness Mendis
- 1967: Nandadeva D. Wijesekera
- 1967–1970: Charles Edmund Godakumbura
- 1971–1973: Nandadeva D. Wijesekera
- 1974–1976: Henry W. Thambiah
- 1977–1979: D.P.E. Hettiaratchi
- 1980–1985: Manikku Badaturu Ariyapala
- 1986: Prof. Thambiah Nadaraja
- 1987–1991: Christopher Gunapala Uragoda
- 1992–1993: Kankani Tantri Wilson Sumanasuriya
- 1994–1995: A. Denis N. Fernando
- 1996–1997: R.C. de S. Manukulasooriya
- 1998: Manikku Badaturu Ariyapala
- 1998: G.P.S. Harischandra de Silva
- 2000–2001: H.N.S. Karunatilake
- 2002–2006: Suraweerage Gunadasa Samarasinghe
- 2009–2015: Susantha Goonatilake
- 2016–present: Hema Goonatilake
