= Journal of the Ceylon Branch of the Royal Asiatic Society =

The Royal Asiatic Society of Sri Lanka (Ceylon before 1972) has published a journal since 1845.
