= Subarnarekha River =

River in northeastern part of India

Subarnarekha River Swarnarekha River
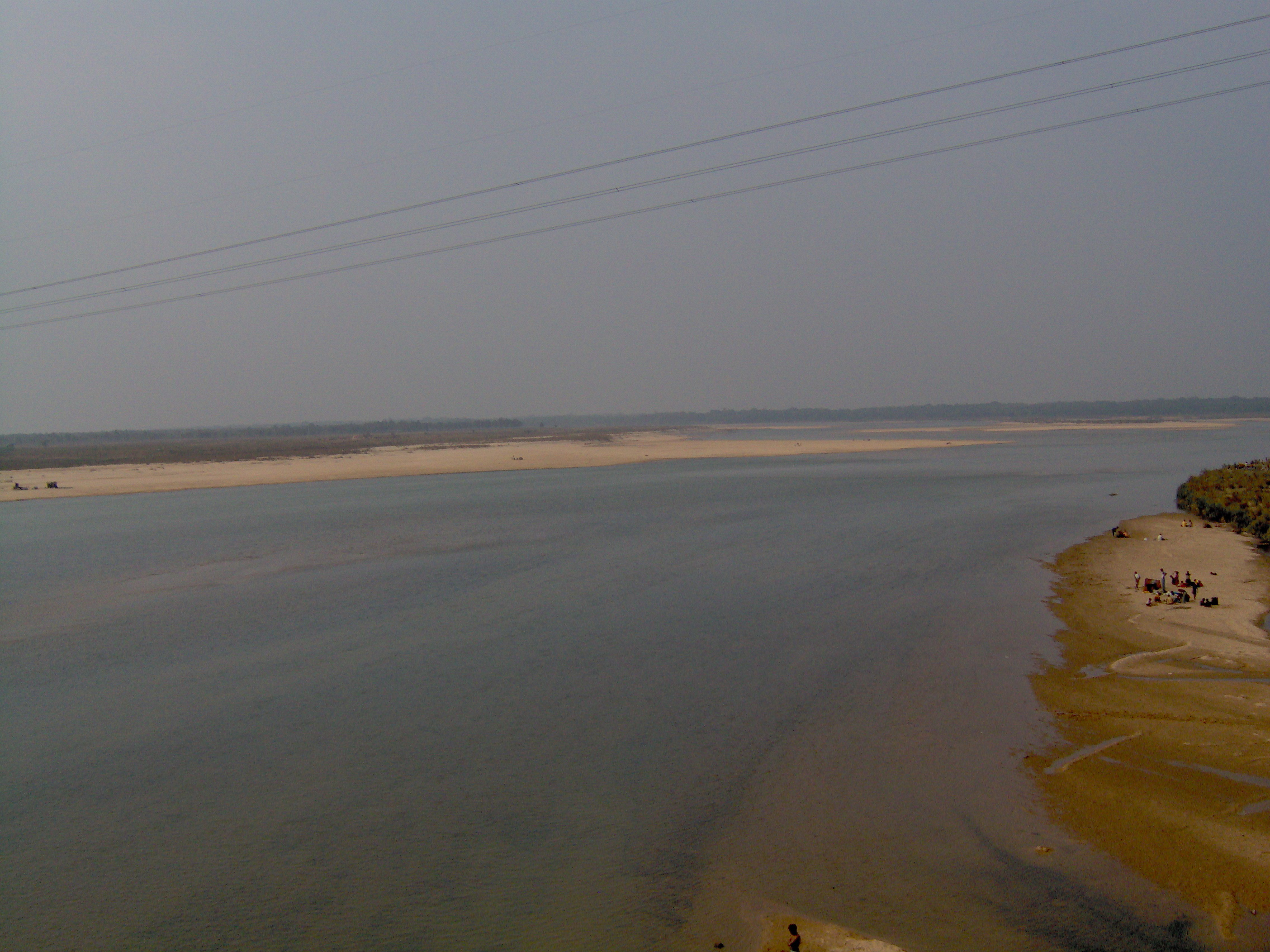
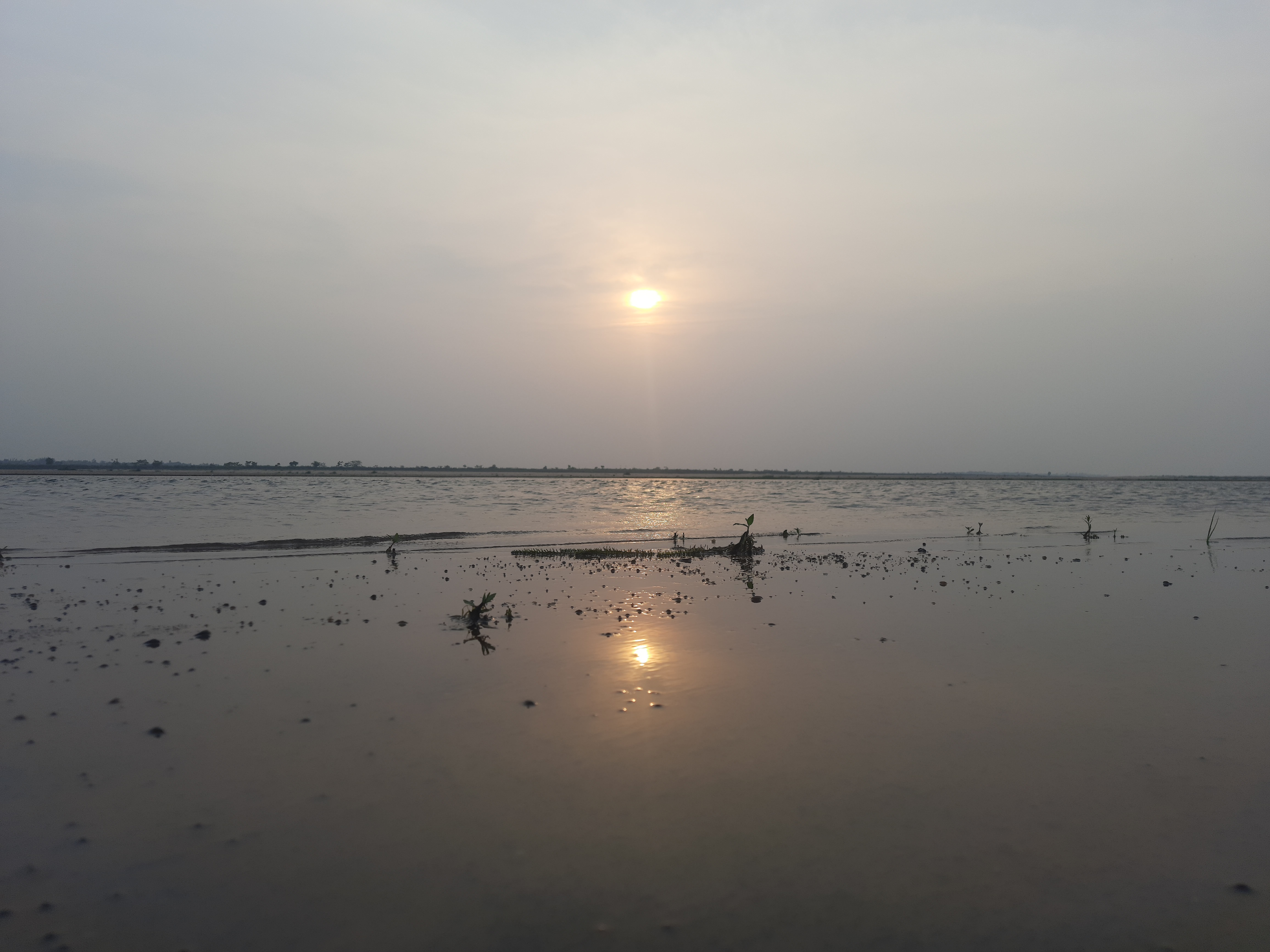
- Subarnarekha in December 2005 at Gopiballavpur Sunset in Subarnarekha river

- Location of the mouth in India Subarnarekha River (India)

Location
- Country: India
- State: Jharkhand, Odisha, West Bengal
- Cities: Ranchi, Chandil, Jamshedpur, Ghatshila, Gopiballavpur, Jaleswar

Physical characteristics
- Source
  - location: Piska/Nagri (Rani Chuan) near Ranchi, Chota Nagpur Plateau
  - coordinates: 23°18′N 85°11′E
  - elevation: 610 m (2,000 ft)
- Mouth: Bay of Bengal
  - location: Kirtania port, Odisha, India
  - coordinates: 21°33′18″N 87°23′31″E
- Length: 395 km (245 mi)
- Basin size: 18,951 km^{2} (7,317 sq mi)
- Discharge
  - average: 392 m^{3}/s (13,800 cu ft/s)
- Discharge
  - location: Kokpara
  - average: 310 m^{3}/s (11,000 cu ft/s)
  - minimum: 1 m^{3}/s (35 cu ft/s)
  - maximum: 2,205 m^{3}/s (77,900 cu ft/s)

Basin features
- Tributaries
  - left: Dulang River
  - right: Kanchi River, Kharkai, Karkari River, Raru River, Garru River

The Subarnarekha River flows through the Indian states of Jharkhand, West Bengal and Odisha.

== Etymology ==
The name is a compound of two words: "Subarna," meaning gold, and "Rekha," meaning line or streak in Indian languages. As per tradition, gold was mined near the origin of the river at a village named Piska near Ranchi, hence the name Subarnarekha or "streak of gold". Legend has it that traces of gold were found in the riverbed. Even now, people look for traces of gold particles in its sandy beds.

== Course ==
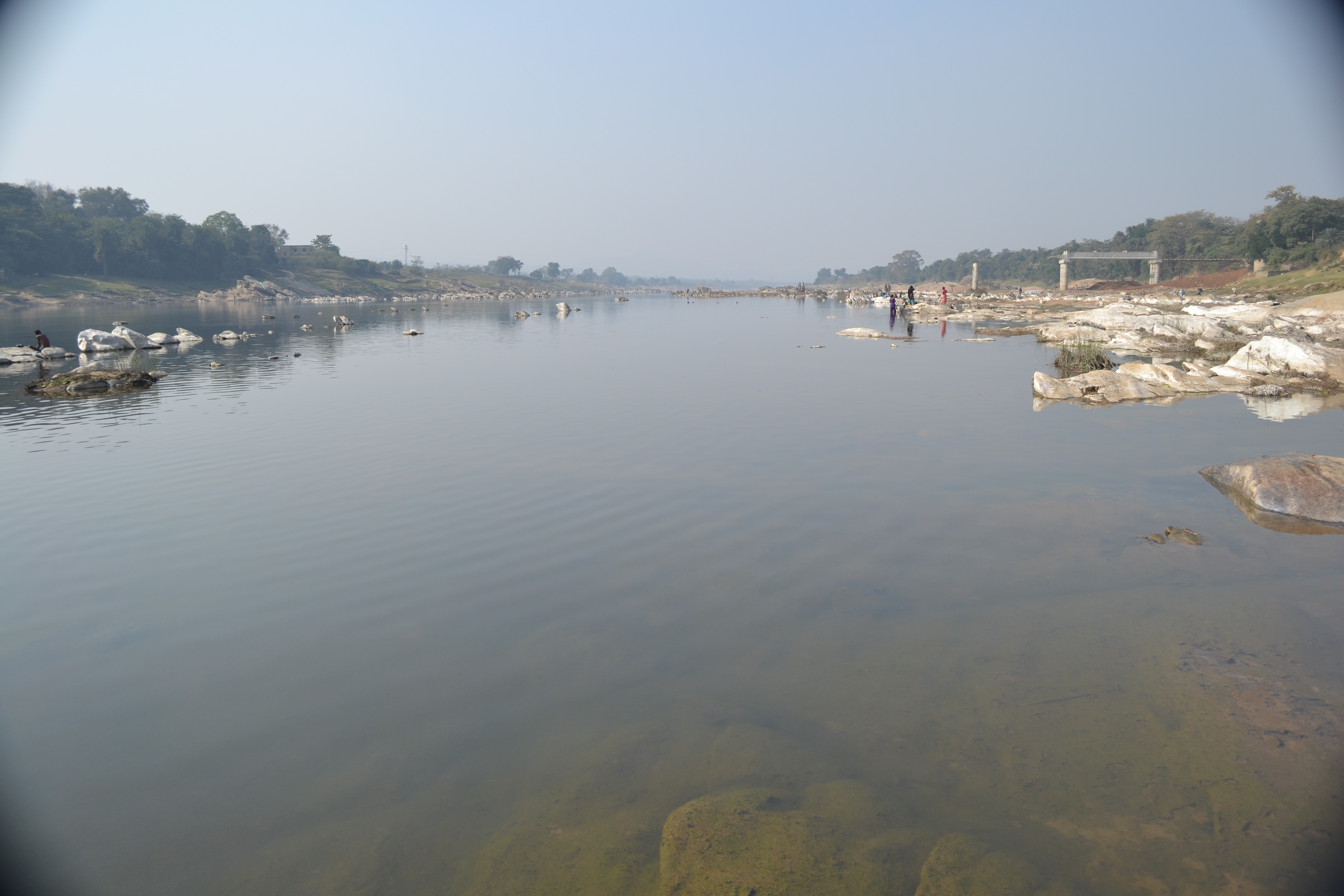
Subarnarekha river in Ghatshila, Jharkhand

After originating near Piska/Nagri, near Ranchi, the capital of Jharkhand, the Subarnarekha traverses a long distance through Ranchi, Seraikela Kharsawan, and East Singhbhum districts in the state. Thereafter, it flows for shorter distances through Paschim Medinipur district in West Bengal for 83 kilometres (52 mi) and Balasore district of Odisha. There, it flows for 79 kilometres (49 mi) and joins the Bay of Bengal near Talsari. The total length of the river is 395 kilometres (245 mi).

The basin of the Subarnarekha is smaller than most multi-state river basins in India. The rain-fed river covers a drainage area of 18,951 square kilometres (7,317 mi^{2})

=== Tributaries ===
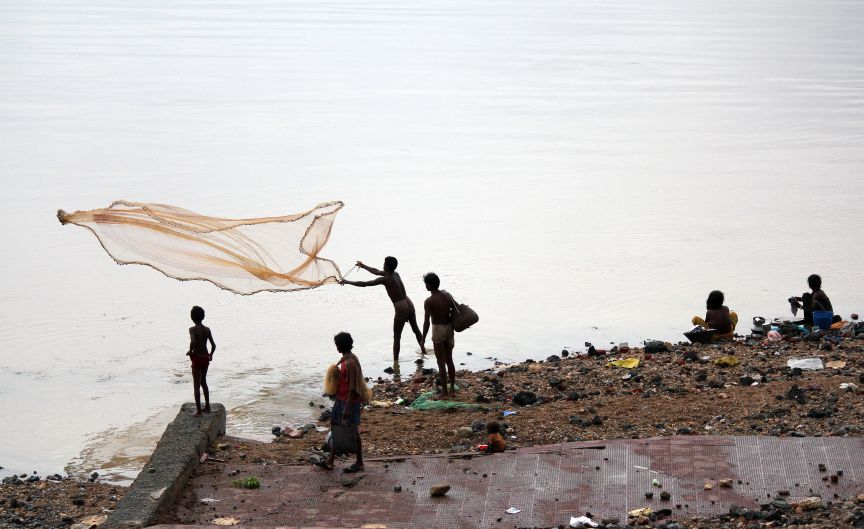
Fishing at Subarnarekha river near Domohani (confluence of Subarnarekha and Kharkhai)

The prominent tributaries of the Subarnarekha are Kharkai, Roro, Kanchi, Harmu Nadi, Damra, Karru, Chinguru, Karakari, Gurma, Garra, Singaduba, Kodia, Dulunga and Khaijori. The Kharkai meets the Subarnarekha at Sonari (Domuhani), a neighborhood of Jamshedpur.

=== Hundru Falls ===
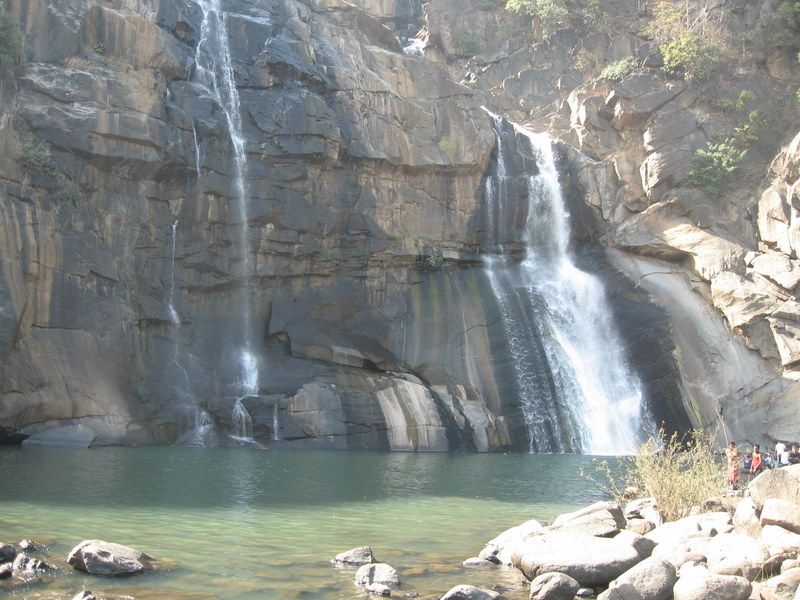
Hundru Falls

Hundru Falls is created on the course of the Subarnarekha, where it falls from a height of 98 metres (322 ft). The spectacular sight of water falling from such a great height is a sight to behold. The different rock formations due to erosion by the constantly falling water have added to the beauty of the place.

=== Pollution ===
The Subarnarekha passes through areas with extensive mining of copper and uranium ores. As a result of unplanned mining activities, the river is polluted. The Subarnarekha has been the lifeline of tribal communities inhabiting the Chhotanagpur region and water pollution affects their livelihood. It is getting more pollutants from the aluminium factory of Muri.

=== Flood ===
Several areas in the lower reaches of the Subarnarekha, particularly the coastal areas of Odisha and West Bengal, are within the flood hazard zone. The Subarnarekha in Odisha had crossed its previous Highest Flood Level (HFL) of 12.2 metres (40 ft) in 2007, surpassing the earlier record of 1997. In 2009, the Subarnarekha witnessed flash floods following heavy rainfall in the upper catchment areas of the river. During the flood, large areas of Jaleswar, Bhograi and Baliapal blocks and a small pocket of Basta block in Balasore district of Odisha were affected. Certain areas of Medinipur in West Bengal are also affected by floods.

== Projects ==
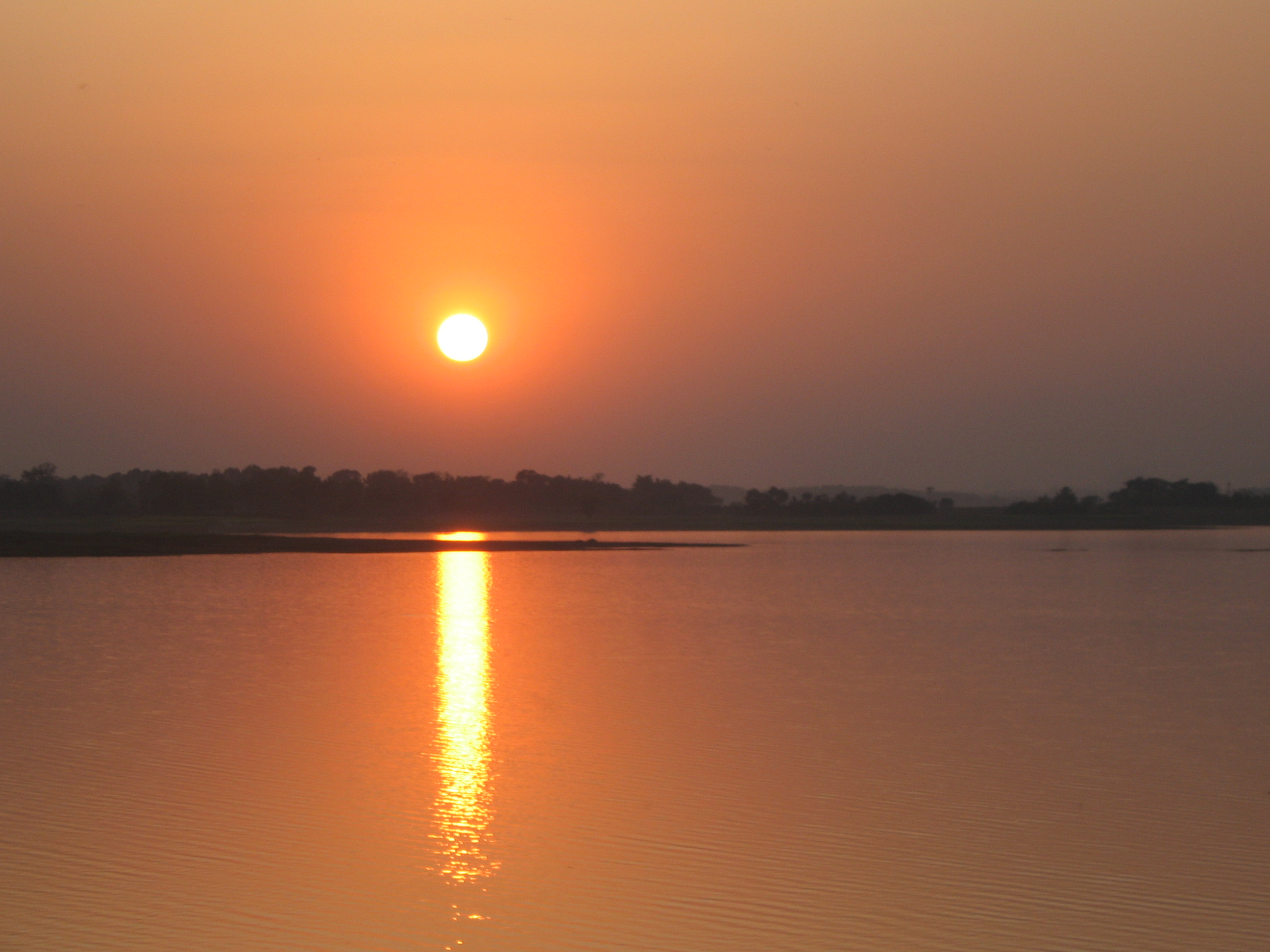
Sunset across Getalsud reservoir

=== Getalsud ===
Getalsud reservoir is located across the Subernarekha, 40 kilometres (25 mi) east of Ranchi and about 50 kilometres (31 mi) from its point of origin. Completed in 1971, this multi-purpose reservoir was envisaged mainly to meet municipal water demands of Ranchi city and the adjoining industrial area. The height of the dam is 35.5 metres (116 ft). There are two power houses in Sikidiri with one unit of 65 MW each. Sikidiri Hydal Power Plants are the only hydal projects in Jharkhand.

=== Subarnarekha multipurpose project ===
The Subarnarekha multipurpose project envisaged the construction of two dams, one at Chandil across the Subarnarekha and the other across the Kharkai at Icha near Chaibasa, two barrages at Galudih across the Subarnarekha and the other across the Kharkai at Ganjia near Adityapur and a network of canals from these. Three small storage reservoirs and a network of canals from these reservoirs are in Orissa. Started in 1982–83, the multipurpose project was planned for irrigation, hydropower generation and water supply. While the Chandil dam and Galudih barrage are almost complete, the other components are still incomplete. Subernarekha Barrage project (West Bengal) envisages construction of a barrage across the Subarnarekha downstream of Chandil dam and Galudih barrage near Bhosraghat to irrigate 114,198 hectares (282,190 acres) annually in the Medinipur district of West Bengal through a left bank canal and its distribution system covering a culturable command area of 96,860 hectares (239,300 acres). The project was taken up for construction in the year 1995–96.

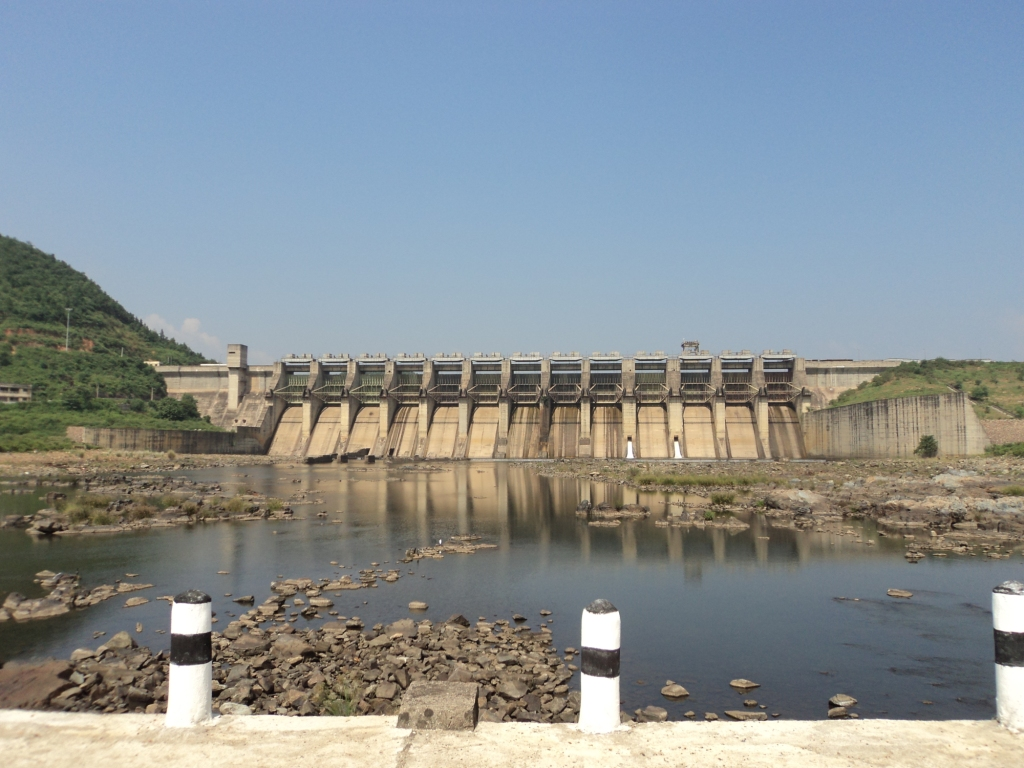
Completed Chandil Dam

The Chandil Dam and reservoir required 17,028 hectares (42,080 acres) of land. Icha Dam submerged 8,585 hectares (21,210 acres) of land in Jharkhand and 4,415 hectares (10,910 acres) of land in Orissa. The Ganjia Barrage required 266 hectares (660 acres) of land. Galudiha Barrage required 180 hectares (440 acres) of land, of which 150 hectares (370 acres) was private land and 30 hectares was Revenue Land. The canal network required additional land. The project experienced protests from its inception in 1975 and, in 1978, some 10,000 of them demonstrated against the dam at the construction site. To address the protests, the government increased the compensation package for 12,000 families and 2,200 people got jobs in different government departments.

The construction of Chandil dam, Icha dam and Galudih barrage are complete. This dam is one of the most visited places of Jharkhand. The museum located close to the Chandil dam has scripts written on rocks, which are 2,000 years old.

== Subarnarekha port ==
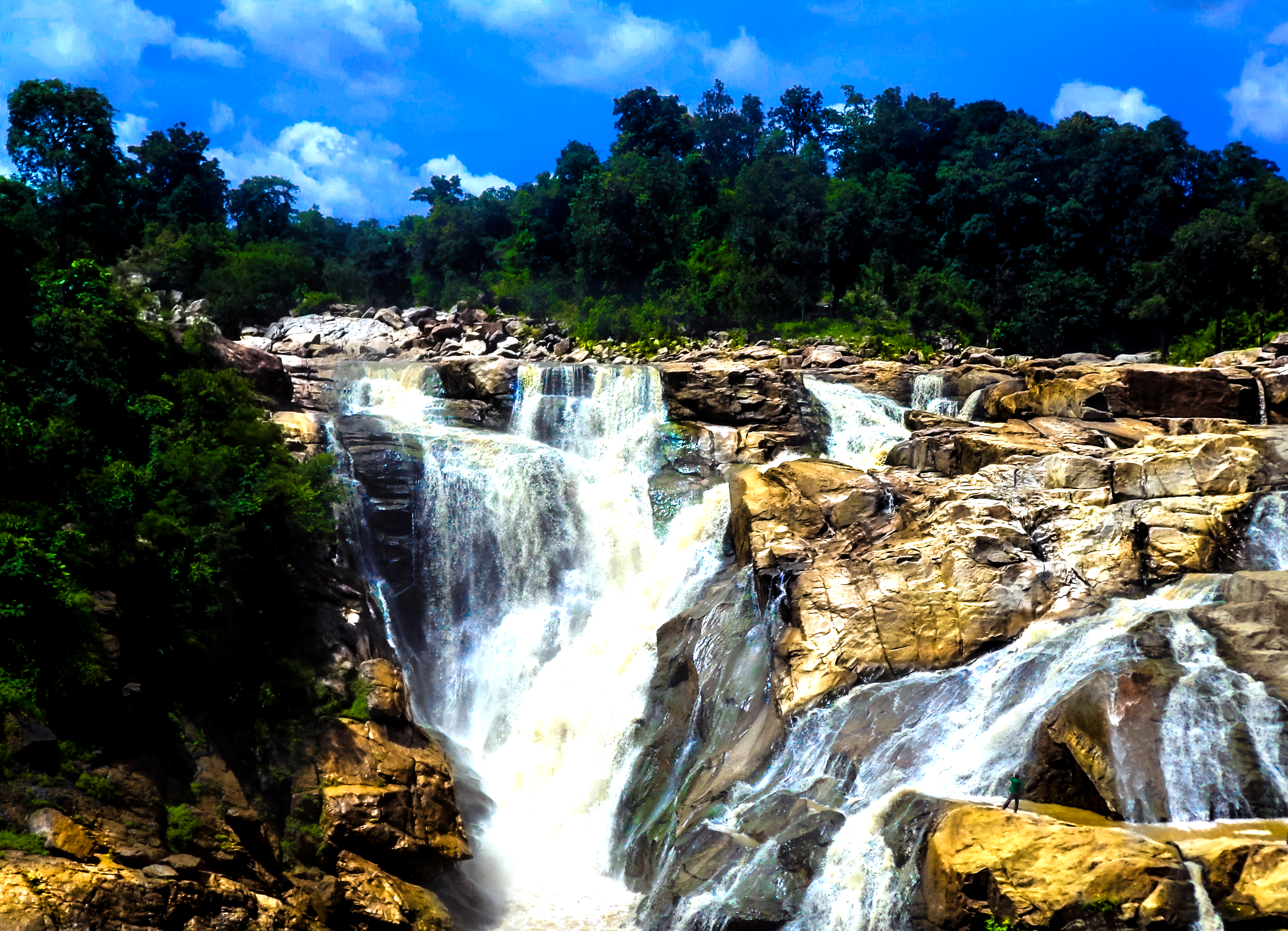
Dassam fall on Kanchi River before it merges with Subarnarekha

The Government of Odisha has signed a memorandum of understanding with Chennai-based Creative Port Development Pvt. Ltd. for the development of a deep-water, all-weather project at Kirtania at the mouth of the Subarnarekha. The Kirtania Port project was being taken up on a 50-year build, own, operate, share and transfer (boost) basis. The development would include a dedicated rail cum road connection from the port to the NH 5 and rail network at Jaleswar. More recently the project is being referred to as Subarnarekha port. The foundation stone was laid in 2019.

== Film ==
Ritwik Ghatak directed a Bengali film Subarnarekha in 1965. Ghatak's films are deeply haunted by the spectre of the partition of Bengal in 1947. In the film Subarnarekha, Ghatak "has rendered the very idea of home as a sentimental place on an elusive other side that, like the distant, opposing banks of the Subarnarekha River, symbolically represents an idealized, and intranscendible, elsewhere."
