= Kirtania Port =

Proposed port in Odisha, India

- Interactive map of Kirtania Port

Location
- Country: India
- Location: Chaumukh, Balsore, Odisha

Details
- Operated by: Subarnarekha Port Private Limited
- Owned by: Tata Group (51%); Creative Port (49%)
- Type of Harbor: Coastal breakwater

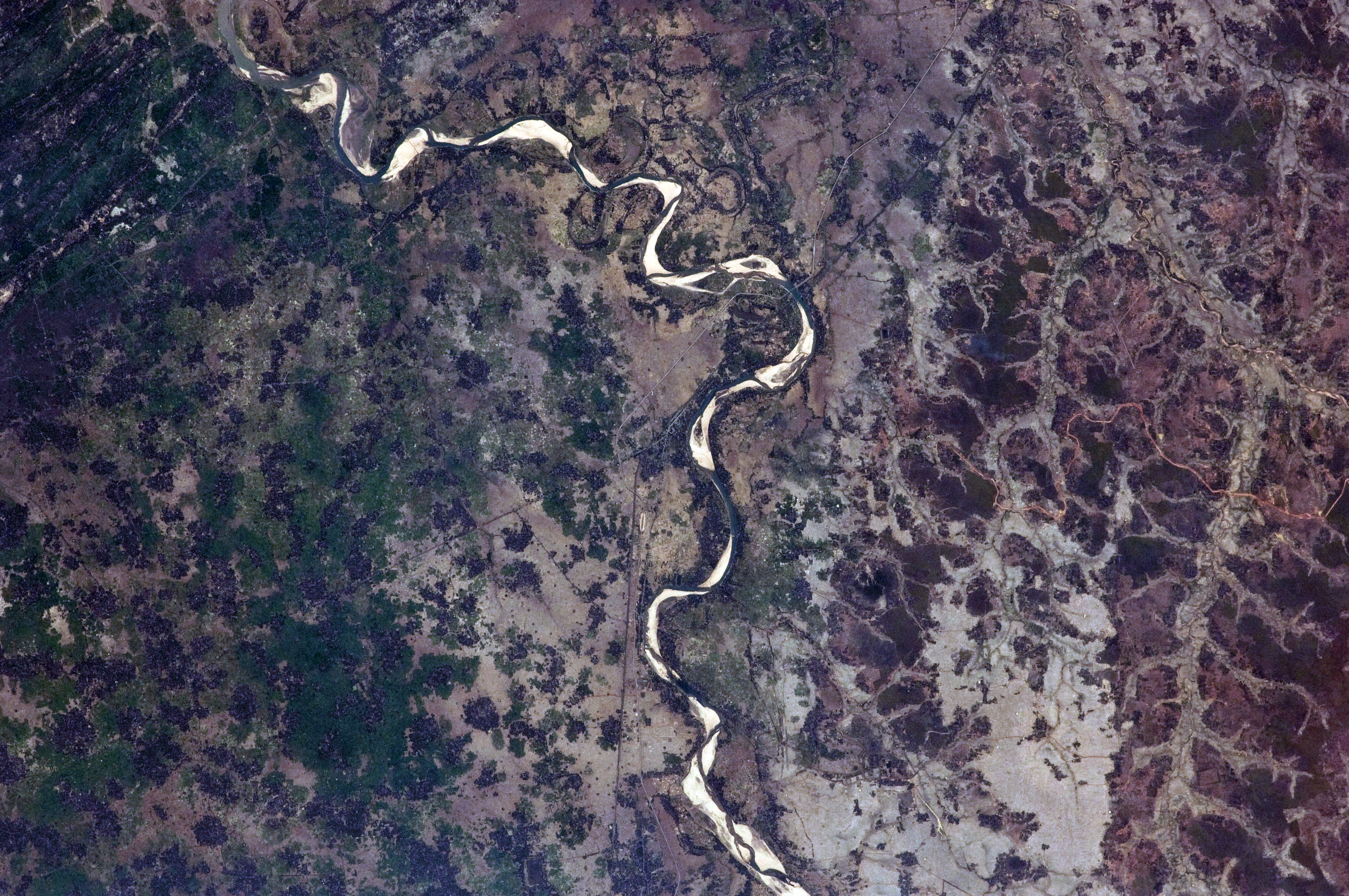
Satellite view of the Subarnarekha River, where the Kirtania Port is proposed to be constructed.

Kirtania Port, also known as Subarnarekha Port, is a deep-water, all-weather port proposed to be constructed at the mouth of Subarnarekha River in Balasore district in the Indian state of Odisha. The foundation stone for the port was laid in 2019.

== Background ==
For over 40 years there was only one major port in Odisha, at Paradip with less major ports at Gopalpur and Dhamra Port. That picture has changed dramatically in the past few years.

Based on a study by IIT Madras, the Government of Odisha had identified 13 locations along the state's 480 kilometres (300 mi) coast line as suitable for setting up of ports. Thereafter, in order to facilitate the setting up of new ports with participation of private parties the state government had formulated in 2004 a separate port policy.

Apart from the Dhamra port, which is set to be operational by mid-2010, progress has been achieved in setting up three other ports – Kirtania port at Subarnarekha mouth, Astaranga port in Puri and Chudamani port in Bhadrak. After implementation of these projects, Odisha is expected to become the vital exit point for not only the state, but other land-locked states like Chhattisgarh, Jharkhand and Madhya Pradesh.

== Geography ==
Kirtania is located at 21.561210°N 87.329280°E at Chaumukh village.

== Port development ==
The Government of Odisha has signed a memorandum of understanding with Chennai-based Creative Port Development Pvt. Ltd. For the development of a deep-water, all-weather project at Kirtania at the mouth of the Subarnarekha. The Kirtania Port project was being taken up on a 50-year build, own, operate, share and transfer (boost) basis. The development would include a dedicated rail cum road connection from the port to the NH 5 and rail network at Jaleswar. The port will have an initial capacity to handle 10 million tonnes per year.

The work on the proposed port has been delayed because of a legal tussle between the promoters and venture capital investors of the company. The Promoter aggrieved by their Venture partners had filed an oppression & Mismanagement case under sec 397,398 & 402 of the Companies Act 1956 in the Company Law Board(CLB). The CLB has given a verdict in favour of the promoter shareholders. The Venture Capitalist has been ordered to exit from the Promoter's Company as well as Kirtania Port Project at a price of Rs. 52.50 Crore.
