= Henrik Eggers =

c. 1629 – 1674 Danish businessman and Governor of Danish India

7th Governor of Tranquebar
- In office 1669–1673 Co-leading with Eskild Andersen Kongsbakke and Sivert Adeler
- Monarchs: Frederick III; Christian V
- Preceded by: Eskild Andersen Kongsbakke
- Succeeded by: Sivert Adeler

Personal details
- Born: c. 1629 Holbæk, Denmark–Norway
- Died: 1674 Masulipatnam, Golconda
- Spouse: Elisabeth Klingenberg
- Children: Poul Eggers
- Parent(s): Herman Eggers; Else Jørgensdatter Altewelt

Military service
- Allegiance: Denmark–Norway 1668–1674
- Rank: Vice commander
- Battles/wars: Sieges of Tranquebar

Henrik Hermansen Eggers (Note: Danish: [hɛnʁɛg haɐ̯mansən ɛgɐs]) (alternatively spelled Heinrich; c. 1629 – 1674) was a Danish businessman, vice commander, and governor of Danish India from 1669 to 1672, co-leading with Eskild Andersen Kongsbakke and Sivert Adeler.

Eggers was born in about 1629 to the mayor of Holbæk, Herman Eggers, and Else Jørgensdatter Altewelt. In 1661, Eggers married the wealthy widow Elisabeth Klingenberg and subsequently moved to Østergade, Copenhagen. Here, he would work with gunpowder, initiating several big projects with financial support from his wife.

Eggers applied on 8 September 1668 for permission from King Christian V of Denmark to establish a saltpetre works at Fort Dansborg in Tranquebar. Additionally, on 18 September, he would be appointed Vice Commander of Tranquebar, arriving there on 31 May 1669.

Not long after arrival, Eggers would be embroiled in a conflict with co-leader and governor Eskild Andersen Kongsbakke and his wife. Subsequently, Eggers would be removed from his role as Vice Commander in 1672 and ordered to embark on the next ship to Denmark. Despite this, Eggers took the route on land, planning to cross Persia and the Arabian Peninsula; however, he would die in 1674 in Masulipatnam before initiating the journey.

== Businessman in Copenhagen ==
Henrik Eggers was born in about 1629 in Holbæk, Denmark, to the mayor of the town, Herman Eggers, and Else Jørgensdatter Altewelt. In 1661, Eggers married the wealthy widow Elisabeth Klingenberg and consequently moved to Østergade, Copenhagen. Eggers continued the operation of a gunpowder mill at Ørholm and its supplies to the state despite an already considerable amount of debt owed to the latter. However, the state gave remittance advice to Eggers by payment through Norwegian customs revenue. This was a relatively reassuring payment assurance by the standards of the time, and such a guarantee was only given because the state prioritized gunpowder production.

Eggers was initially unknown in the Copenhagen bourgeoisie, but he soon began to make a name for himself in various ways. He likely had some financial means due to his background as the son of a mayor, yet he was probably better off after marrying Elisabeth Klingenberg. It is probably with his wife's financial backing that he, on 20 May 1663, presented a 20-year exclusive right for Denmark and Norway to establish a glue or starch factory in Copenhagen. Despite the results of this project being unknown, it must not have occupied Eggers to the extent that in October 1666, he proposed to the king regarding an even more ambitious project: In exchange for receiving a skilling for every rigsdaler collected in all Danish towns from goods that had not yet been taxed, he would annually supply 50 centner (approx. 5000 kg) of saltpeter for the state's needs The proposal was outright rejected by the state, which believed that Eggers would earn too much compared to the amount of saltpeter he would provide.

== Relation with Poul Klingenberg ==
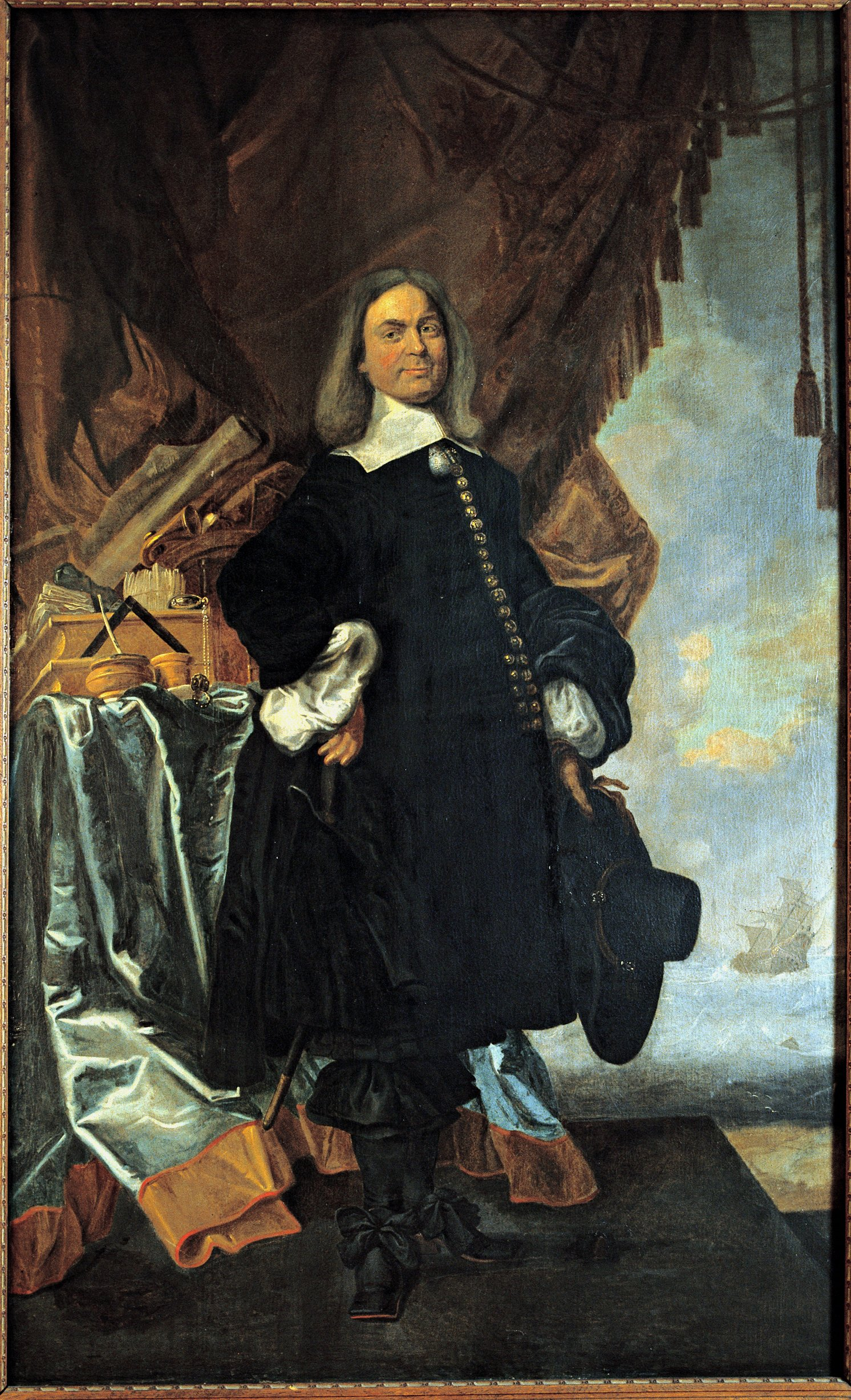
Paul Klingenberg, the first general postmaster of Denmark and brother-in-law to Henrik Eggers

Despite his ambitions, Eggers was losing money and could not run the business. His brother-in-law, Poul von Klingenberg, was a wealthy and influential merchant who may have helped Eggers secure the exclusive rights to establish a starch factory in 1663. As a result of the financial conditions, Eggers did not live up to Klingenberg's expectations as a brother-in-law, and Klingenberg had to intervene to secure his nephews' inheritance in March 1668. In the following year, Elisabeth Klingenberg would die, and Eggers had to completely relinquish both the estate on Østergade and the Ørholm Powder Mill. The aforementioned estates passed on to Elisabeth's first husband's children, and Poul Klingenberg would move in on Østergade as their guardian.

By that time, Eggers had left Denmark for a fortune in India, owning nothing more in Copenhagen, where he had only left behind his minor son, Poul, who had been named after Poul Klingenberg. Eggers had embarked for India on 20 October 1668 on the Færø, which was headed for the Danish colony of Tranquebar. With him, Eggers carried a grant to establish a saltpetre factory at Fort Dansborg and an appointment as Vice Commander of Tranquebar. If it turned out that the current governor, Eskild Andersen Kongsbakke, had died, Eggers was to take over the position.

The ship Færø belonged to the Danish naval fleet but was placed at the disposal of Admiral Cort Adeler and Poul Klingenberg and supplied by them. Klingenberg was the Danish East India Company's largest creditor after the Danish king, and the former was offered the Agathe (later renamed the Færø) to mount an expedition to the East Indies. Agathe was brought under the Danish fleet under Cort Adeler during his visit to the Netherlands in 1653, and his son, Sivert Adeler, would command the ship during its voyage. Additionally, Adeler would also lead the colony in cooperation with Eggers and Kongsbakke. With this initiative, the Danish East India trade was to be resumed, and Klingenberg supposedly took the opportunity to send his brother-in-law well out of the way. During the voyage, Eggers became a part of the ship's council.

== Time in Asia ==
The Færø arrived in Tranquebar on 31 May 1669, yet there is no report of the construction of the saltpetre factory. However, his title as Vice Commander of Tranquebar brought him into dispute with the commander and governor, Eskild Andersen Kongsbakke and his wife, Christine Andersen. The latter was fined for her foul mouth, but was forgiven due to her husband's merits by a royal letter dated 10 December 1670, which also confirmed Kongsbakke as commander. By another royal order dated 28 September 1671, the Commission Director of the D.E.I.C. was instructed to establish a commission to adjudicate between Kongsbakke and Eggers. On 20 October 1671, Eggers wrote home to the King with the ship Mageløs that he had increased the capital at Dansborg by 44,000 pardaus, and that he had conquered a piece of land from the Nayak of Thanjavur, which had been hostile to Tranquebar since 1655. This brought in an annual income of 5,000 pardaus. Furthermore, Eggers complained about Kongsbakke and his wife and sent a copy of the local Justice Book.

Because of the dispute with Kongsbakke, Eggers was dismissed from his position as Vice Commander by royal order dated 26 September 1672 and was to return with the next ship to Denmark.

Eggers left Tranquebar in 1673 on the Phønix to go to the Sunda Islands. He subsequently arrived in Bantam on 15 November 1673. In Bantam, Eggers met with the Danes from the Danish lodge in the city and with the Danish ship Oldenburg. On 16 November, Eggers hosted a feast aboard Phønix for the Danish Chief Merchant in Bantam, Johan Joakim Paulli. During the feast, news arrived of the grounding of Oldenburg 8 miles (13 km) from Bantam. Eggers and Paulli were shocked, and Paulli quickly went to the Sultan of Bantam for help.

From Bantam around 18 December 1673, Eggers returned to the Coromandel Coast. He intended to go home by land, passing through Persia and the Arabian Peninsula, as the King was said to have ordered him. However, Eggers died in Masulipatnam in 1674, where he was buried with great splendor.

== See also ==
- Eskild Andersen Kongsbakke – c. 1620 – 1674 Danish commander and Governor of Danish India
- Poul Hansen Korsør – 17th-century Danish merchant and governor of Danish India
- Anders Nielsen (colonist) – 16th-century Danish merchant and colonist

== Notes and references ==
=== Works cited ===
- Cortemünde, Johan Petri (1953). Dagbog fra en Ostindiefart [Diary from an East Indian voyage] (PDF) (in Danish). Elsinore: Handels- og Søfartsmuseet.
- Larsen, Kay (1940). Guvernører, Residenter, Kommandanter og Chefer (PDF) (in Danish). Copenhagen: ARTHUR JENSENS FORLAG. p. 61.
- Lauridsen, John (1988). "En »Godfather« i København - indvandreres etablering omkring 1660". Historiske Meddelelser om København [Historical Notices about Copenhagen] (PDF) (in Danish). Copenhagen: Krohns Bogtrykkeri. pp. 7–29.
- Peters, Andrew (2013). Ship Decoration, 1630–1780. Pen & Sword Books. ISBN 978-1-84832-332-2.
- Sethuraman, N. (2016). The Danish East India Company From Establishment To The Epilogue (1616 – 1729) - A Historical Perspective. Salem: Tamil Nadu History Congress Proceedings.
