= Sieges of Tranquebar (1655–1669) =

Warfare in South India from 1655 to 1669

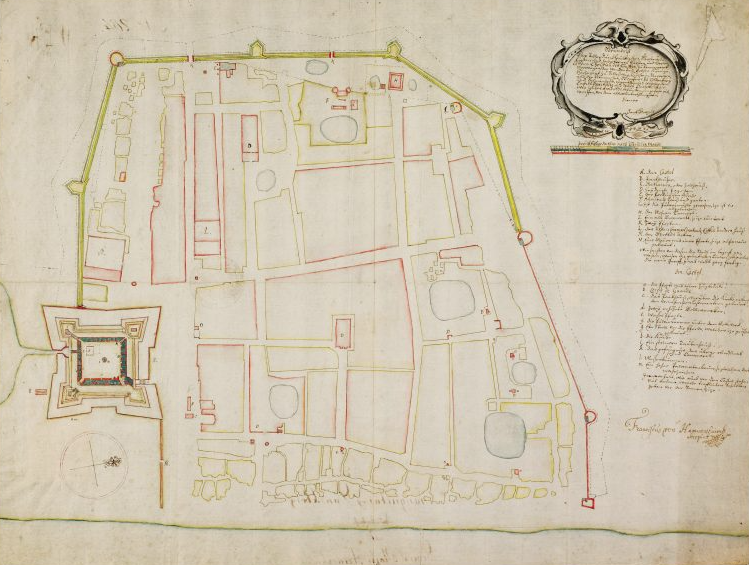
- Tranquebar's fortifications in 1671. Assumed to have been built in the 1660s by Eskild Andersen Kongsbakke
Date	1655–1669
Location	Tranquebar, (present-day Tamil Nadu, india) 11°1′45″N 79°50′58″E
Result	Danish victory
Territorial changes	Poreiar, Tillali, and Erikutanchery ceded to the Danes

Belligerents
(Danish India) Tranquebar	Thanjavur Nayak kingdom

Commanders and leaders
(Danish India) Eskild Andersen (Danish India) Henrik Eggers	Vijaya Raghava

Units involved
(Danish India) Dansborg garrison (Danish India) Færø (Danish India) Topass	Unknown

Strength
2 Danes; Few Portuguese; 1 ship (1669)	Unknown; presumably large

The sieges of Tranquebar (Danish: Belejringerne af Trankebar) refer to the warfare between the Thanjavur Nayak kingdom and the Danish East India Company from 1655 to 1669. The Thanjavurian Nayak besieged the Danish colony of Tranquebar on multiple occasions; however, they were repelled due to the new fortifications being built around the city. A peace agreement was issued in 1669, ceding four Thanjavurian villages to the Danes.

== Background ==
In 1643, the vessel Christianshavn would arrive in Tranquebar with the proclaimed governor, Willem Leyel. This would be the last ship from Denmark for 26 years, as the Dano-Swedish Wars hindered Denmark's ability to send any new cargo to India. This led to financial difficulties and a general lack of manpower in the Danish colony of Tranquebar.

In 1648, a mutiny broke out in Tranquebar, and Governor Leyel was subsequently arrested. He was succeeded by Poul Hansen Korsør, who ruled until his death on 7 September 1655. Furthermore, the first Danish East India Company was dissolved in 1650, and the number of Danes in the colony remained only a handful.

Arriving together with the Christianshavn in 1643, Eskild Andersen Kongsbakke succeeded Korsør and became the new governor of Tranquebar. Kongsbakke would try to preserve the economy by regularly sending ships to Makassar and Bantam, and by privateering against Mughal Bengal.

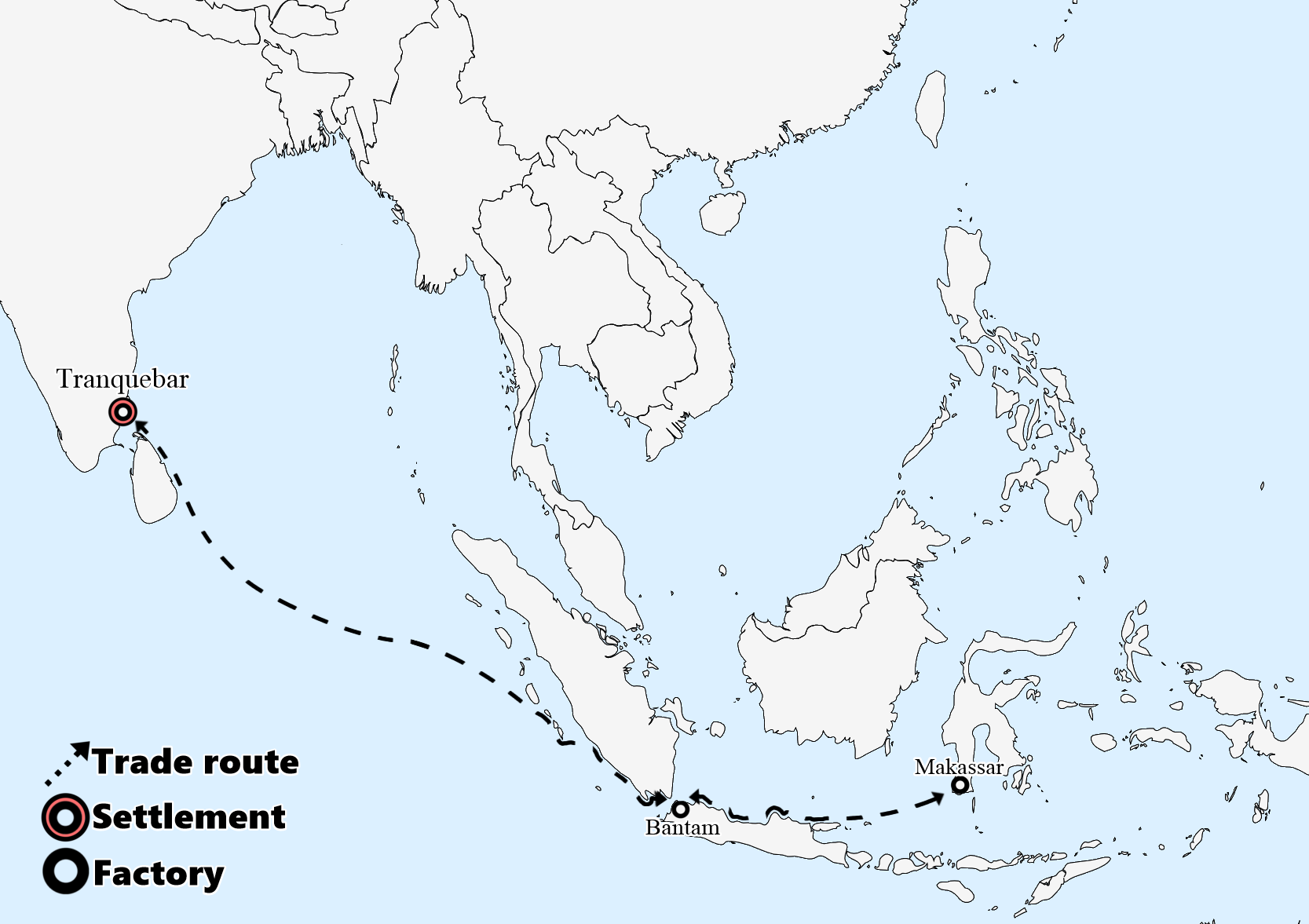
Danish settlements, factories, and trading routes in India from 1643–1669

== Sieges ==
The Nayak of the Thanjavur kingdom, Vijaya Raghava, had waged war against Gingee and Madurai and therefore needed sufficient money to finance his campaigns. The Thanjavurians subsequently took advantage of a weakened position of Tranquebar and, in 1655, demanded to raise the early tribute paid by Tranquebar. When the Danes failed to fulfill this demand, Raghava sent a force to besiege the city, however, Kongsbakke managed to defend the city with the help of local Indians and Portuguese mercenaries.

In 1660, a new siege was initiated, which lasted nine months. In response, Kongsbakke initiated the construction of a wall around the whole town, and made the locals build a curtain wall around the city, with four additional towers. Previously, only Fort Dansborg was fortified, and the Inhabitants of Tranquebar would subsequently seek shelter there.

In May 1669, the 29-year isolation period was over with the arrival of the Danish frigate Færø. Færø arrived with soldiers and provisions under the command of Henrik Eggers. As a result of Færø's arrival, peace was concluded with Vijaya Raghava.

== Aftermath ==
As a result of the peace, the nayak ceded the villages of Poreiar, Tillali, and Erikutanchery to the Danes, which greatly enlarged the Danish settlement. Meanwhile, Færø would be sent to Java to reestablish trade connections with the local sultan.

== See also ==
- Willem Leyel's siege of Dansborg – Siege of Fort Dansborg, 1644
- HDMS Færøe – Frigate
- Tillali Massacre – 1756 Massacre of Europeans in India
- Henrik Eggers – c. 1629 – 1674 Danish businessman and Governor of Danish India

== Works cited ==
- Bredsdorff, Asta (2009). The Trials and Travels of Willem Leyel. Copenhagen: Museum Tusculanum Press. ISBN 9788763530231.
- Gregersen, Hans (2018). Trankebar [Tranquebar] (in Danish). Forlag A/S. pp. 12–13. ISBN 9788711978337.
- Dahl, Bjørn Westerbeek (1995). Magasin fra Det kongelige Bibliotek [Magazine from the Royal Library] (PDF) (in Danish). Copenhagen: Viggo Dalls Musikforlag.
- Sethuraman, N. (2016). The Danish East India Company From Establishment To The Epilogue (1616 – 1729) - A Historical Perspective. Salem: Tamil Nadu History Congress Proceedings.
