= Sivert Adeler =

Danish captain and colonial administrator (1647–1683)

8th Governor of Tranquebar
- In office 1673–1682 Co-leading with Henrik Eggers and Eskild Andersen Kongsbakke
- Monarch: Christian V
- Preceded by: Henrik Eggers
- Succeeded by: Axel Juel

Personal details
- Born: 1647 Hoorn, Netherlands
- Died: 24 January 1683 Off the Cape of Good Hope
- Parent(s): Cort Adeler; Engelke Sofronia

Military service
- Allegiance: Dutch Republic? Denmark–Norway 1666–1682
- Rank: Captain
- Battles/wars: Second Anglo-Dutch War; Sieges of Tranquebar

Sivert Cortsen Adeler (Note: Danish: [si:ʊ̯ɐ̯d ko:dsən æ:ðəlɐ]) (alternative spellings include Sigvart and Adelaer; 1647 – 24 January 1683) was a Dano-Norwegian naval officer, captain, and overhoved of Danish India from 1673 to 1682, co-leading with Henrik Eggers and Eskild Andersen Kongsbakke until 1674.

Adeler was born in 1647 in Hoorn, Netherlands, and was the firstborn son of Admiral Cort Adeler and Engelke Sofronia. In 1663, Adeler came to Denmark–Norway with his father, where he was appointed captain in 1666. In 1668, Adeler became commanding officer (befalingsmand) on the frigate Færøe, which was sent to the East Indies in the same year. Arriving in the Danish colony of Tranquebar in May 1669, Adeler would bring goods and gifts from the Danish king to the Sultan of Bantam.

Adeler returned to Denmark in September 1670 and was promoted to Schout-bij-nacht. The following year, he was sent to Holland for further education in naval warfare. In 1672, Adeler again departed for India, being appointed Governor of Tranquebar. His tenure would end in October 1682, when he abandoned the post in favour of Axel Juel. Adeler died off the Cape of Good Hope on 24 January 1683 on his return voyage to Denmark.

== Early life and service in the Dano-Norwegian Navy ==
Sivert Adeler was born in 1647 in Hoorn, Netherlands, as the oldest son of the Dano-Norwegian admiral Cort Adeler and his Dutch wife, Engelke Sofronia. Adeler was possibly first in Dutch service and came to Denmark with his father in 1663, where he was appointed as captain on 14 March 1667. He became the chief of the frigate Duisburg in Bergen during the Second Anglo-Dutch War and thereafter sailed to Copenhagen, arriving there on 1 June 1667. Later, he joined a Danish squadron in the Netherlands; however, sickness plagued the squadron, and Adeler was terminally ill when he arrived in Copenhagen. Despite little hope for improvement, Adeler managed to recover.

== Voyage on Færø ==
In September 1668, Adeler became the captain of the frigate Færø, which was sent to the Danish colony in India, Tranquebar. With it, the frigate had a cargo of primarily lead and iron, although it also included various gifts for local rulers. After seven months of sailing, Færø arrived in Tranquebar on 31 May 1669. Upon his arrival, Adeler was 21 years old, and he began to improve the conditions in the colony. In cooperation with Vice Commander Henrik Eggers and Governor Eskild Andersen Kongsbakke, Adeler would lead the colony, installing new officers on Fort Dansborg, and accommodating new soldiers were accommodated in the garrison. Moreover, Adeler assured housing to all civil servants and started a major renovation of Tranquebar. Additionally, he managed to establish peace with the Thanjavurian Nayak, who had been at war with the Danish East India Company since 1655. According to the subsequent treaty, the villages of Poreiar, Tillali, and Erikutanchery were ceded to the Danes, significantly enlarging the colony.

In August 1669, Adeler continued his voyage to Bantam, Java, concluding a treaty with the Sultan of Bantam and offering personal gifts to the Sultan from Christian V. Additionally, a new Danish lodge was established at Bantam as a stipulation of the treaty. Following this, Adeler returned home with the Færø, arriving in Copenhagen in September 1670, where he would receive much acknowledgement for his successful expedition. Subsequently, he would be appointed Schout-bij-nacht in the same year and would be sent to the Netherlands for further naval education.

Following Færø's successful voyage, a new Danish East India Company would be established in the Fall of 1670. According to the charter, the Danish king would personally own Tranquebar, but with exclusive rights for the Company's shareholders and directors to conduct business in the town. Furthermore, it was emphasized that it was the Dano-Norwegian State that had the right to property over the colony, while it was the monarch's responsibility to maintain and protect Fort Dansborg.

== Governor of Traquebar ==
On 13 November 1672, Adeler was appointed Governor of Tranquebar and departed for India again on the Haabet. Arriving some time after 1672, Adeler would serve as governor until 1682. During his tenure, he would initiate peace negotiations with the Great Mughal and the Nawab of Bengal, who had been at war with the Danish Company since 1642. Peace was formally established in 1674, with both sides being denied compensation for their losses. However, the Danes reacquired rights to establish lodges in Bengal and to trade tariff-free in Balasore and Pipli. Two years later, the Danish Company also got the right to establish lodges at the Ganges and the Hooghly River. Furthermore, the agreement was ratified by the Great Mughal, Aurangzeb, in 1677 with the condition that the Danes pay 2,5% tariffs on all goods. Adeler also extended Danish trade to the Philippines.

During Adeler's governorship, trade between Denmark and India flourished, with cargoes from Denmark almost becoming regular. Furthermore, the number of employers increased substantially to 1700 people, the majority of whom were Indians and Portuguese, with only 150 Scandinavians. However, the flourishing ended in 1680, when three Danish ships got stranded, and the connection between Denmark and India ceased for some years. In 1682, Adeler initiated his return to Denmark to discuss with the company directors in Copenhagen. Adeler journeyed back home on the Flvynde Ulv; however, he died on board off the coast of the Cape of Good Hope on 24 January 1683. He would subsequently be buried in Cape Town with great splendor.

== See also ==
- Cort Adeler – Norwegian seaman (1622–1675)
- Peter Anker
- Dano-Mughal Treaty – Treaty between the Mughal Empire and Denmark-Norway
- Moritz Hartmann (officer) – 1657–1695 Danish naval officer and governor of Danish India

== Notes and references ==
=== Works cited ===
- Larsen, Kay (1940). Guvernører, Residenter, Kommandanter og Chefer (PDF) (in Danish). Copenhagen: Arthur Jensens Forlag. p. 61.
- Bricka, Carl Frederik (1887). Dansk biografisk lexikon [Danish biographic lexicon] (in Danish). Gyldendal. p. 95.
- Topsøe-Jensen, Theodor Andreas (1835). Officerer i den Dansk-Norske Søetat 1660 – 1814 og den Danske Søetat 1814 – 1932 (PDF) (in Danish). Copenhagen: H. Hagerups Forlag. pp. 9–10.
- Lind, Hans Daniel (1896). Kong Frederik den Tredjes Sømagt [King Frederick III's Naval Power] (PDF) (in Danish). Odense: Milo'ske Boghandel.
- Ustvedt, Yngvar (2001). Trankebar: nordmenn i de gamle tropekolonier (in Norwegian). Cappelen Damm.
- Bastrup, C. (1919). Danmarks Søfart og Søhandel [Danish Shipping and Maritime Trade] (in Danish). Copenhagen: Nyt Nordisk Forlag.
- Gregersen, Hans (2018). Trankebar [Tranquebar] (in Danish). Forlag A/S. pp. 12–13. ISBN 9788711978337.
- Sethuraman, N. (2016). The Danish East India Company From Establishment To The Epilogue (1616 – 1729) - A Historical Perspective. Salem: Tamil Nadu History Congress Proceedings.
