= Eskild Andersen Kongsbakke =

c. 1620 – 1674 Danish commander and Governor of Danish India

6th Governor of Tranquebar
- In office 1655–1674 (Note: Kongsbakke would be de jure governor until his death, however, he would be practically pushed aside by his co-leaders after the arrival of the Færø) Co-leading with Henrik Eggers and Sivert Adeler
- Monarchs: Frederick III; Christian V
- Preceded by: Poul Hansen Korsør
- Succeeded by: Henrik Eggers

Personal details
- Born: c. 1620 Kongsbakke, Denmark–Norway
- Died: c. 1674 Tranquebar, Danish India
- Spouse: Christine Andersdatter

Military service
- Allegiance: Denmark–Norway 1639–1674
- Rank: Commander
- Battles/wars: Dano-Mughal War; Sieges of Tranquebar

Eskild Andersen (Note: Danish: [ɛsgil anɐsən]) (alternatively spelled Eskil; later given the epithet Kongsbakke; c. 1620 – c. 1674), also known by his initials EAK, was a Danish commander and governor of Danish India from 1655 to his death in 1674, co-leading with Henrik Eggers and Sivert Adeler from 1669.

Born in about 1620 in Kungsbacka (Danish: Kongsbakke), present-day Sweden, Kongsbakke would go into the service of the Danish East India Company in 1639. In the same year, he would depart for India on the Christianshavn as the last Danish voyage to India until 1669. Arriving in India, Kongsbakke slowly climbed the Company's hierarchy, becoming the commander of Fort Dansborg in 1655 and thereby also the governor of Tranquebar.

During his governorship, Kongsbakke became the only Dane in the colony and relied on foreign support to defend Dansborg from the Thanjavur Nayak kingdom. Kongsbakke died in Tranquebar in about 1674 and was succeeded by Henrik Eggers and Sivert Adeler.

== Epithet ==
In 17th-century Denmark, names were regularly patronymic, as one's surname would be derived from one's father's name. Consequently, similar and sometimes identical names occurred in Denmark, which other European colonists found confusing. When Eskild Andersen and others arrived in India, their hometown would be added to their name to disambiguate similar names. Eskild Andersen, who came from the then-Danish city of Kongsbakke (Swedish: Kungsbacka), would receive the epithet Kongsbakke.

== Service on Dansborg ==
Kongsbakke was first mentioned in 1639 when he entered the Danish East India Company's service. In the same year, he sailed with the ship Christianshavn to the Danish colony of Tranquebar. After arriving in India in 1643, Kongsbakke would be appointed quartermaster of Fort Dansborg by Governor Willem Leyel. By his quiet but determined manner, Kongsbakke would quickly restore order to the garrison, which had recently been under siege. Sentries were reestablished on each of the fort's bastions and in front of the gate, and a guard was appointed to make sure the sentries were vigilant. Additionally, soldiers were made to drill and were educated in the use of arms. Occasionally, Kongsbakke was also commanded to privateer against the Bengalis, for which he earned 60 pardao a month.

== Governor ==
After Governor Poul Hansen Korsør's death in 1655, the soldiers and inhabitants of Tranquebar chose Kongsbakke as their new leader. Despite him being almost illiterate, he was chosen as there were no Danish officers left in Tranquebar. Soon after he was elected governor, Kongsbakke became the last Dane in the colony, as the Dano-Swedish Wars prevented regular cargoes and crewmen from Denmark.

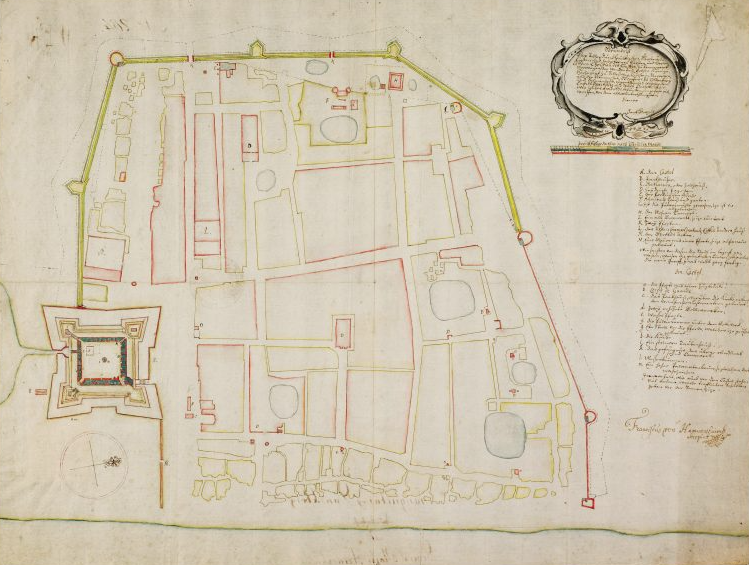
Tranquebar's fortifications in 1671. Usually assumed to have been built in the 1660s by Kongsbakke, however, it may also have been built earlier.

=== War with the Nayak ===
The Nayak of the Thanjavur kingdom, however, took advantage of the Danes' weakened position to attempt to extort money from them. In 1655, the Nayak sent an armed force to Tranquebar. With a defence carefully planned out by Kongbakke and with the support of local Indians, they managed to withstand the siege, and after a while, the siege was lifted. However, no peace was initially concluded, and Tranquebar was besieged several times over the following years, including a siege lasting for nine months. Finally, Kongsbakke managed to negotiate a settlement with the Nayak.

According to the Indian Associate Professor of History Dr. N. Sethuraman, Kongsbakke built a wall around the town of Tranquebar to more easily protect it. However, Danish historian and department librarian, Bjørn Westerbeek Dahl, doubts this, as he considers the fortification methods to old to be used in the 1600s. Instead, Dahl suggests the fortification could have been built in the 1640s during Willem Leyel's tenure or possibly in the 16th century by the Portuguese. At any rate, the wall existed at least in the mid-1660s, and colonial officials were thereby given the opportunity to settle outside the walls of the Fort Dansborg. To that, Kongsbakke built a yard facing Kongsgade (King's Street).

=== Trade and privateering ===
Despite being isolated, Kongsbakke managed to secure the colony's income through participation in regional trade and a sometimes profitable privateering war against the Mughal governor of Bengal. Privateering activities proceeded apace, and ships continued to be seized as prizes and their cargoes sold. The money was invested by Kongsbakke in a large treasury and in repairing Dansborg's fortifications. With the few vessels available, Kongsbakke traded with the Sultanate of Bantam and sent a cargo to Makassar in the mid-1660s, which gave a good yield.

=== Contact with Denmark ===
Initially, Kongsbakke sent several reports back to Denmark on ships of other European nations, although only one arrived in Copenhagen in 1646. Later, between 1662 and 1665, however, he managed to send more regular reports to Copenhagen. However, these very optimistic reports from Kongsbakke were regarded with scepticism in Denmark. During the costly war with the Nayak, it became evident to Kongsbakke that the colony could not survive, and in 1668, he sent a Dutch emissary named Geert van Hagen to Copenhagen. Arriving in Copenhagen, van Hagen finally convinced the Danish government to act upon the matter, and later that year, the government sent the frigate Færø to India. Commanded by Captain Sivert Adeler, the frigate carried provisions and a group of soldiers under Henrik Eggers. According to the instructions, Eggers was appointed vice commander and would become commander and governor if Kongsbakke were not alive.

Færø arrived at Tranquebar in May 1669, reigniting contact after 29 years. Kongsbakke consequently received the King's notice of his formal appointment as governor, in cooperation with Adeler and Eggers.

Additionally, the Færø had also carried an emissary to the Nayak of Thanjavur, and the peace Kongsbakke negotiated was ratified. In a new decree, the villages of Poreiar, Tillali, and Erikutanchery were all ceded to the Danes. Additionally, new routes to Bantam and the Sunda Islands were enacted, with Sivert Adeler concluding a settlement with the Sultan of Bantam about the restoration of a Danish lodge there. Later, in 1673, a delegation was sent to Bengal to end hostilities, concluding a peace treaty the following year.

=== Conflict with Henrik Eggers ===
The relationship between Kongsbakke and Eggers became gradually worse. Kongsbakke would slowly be pushed aside by Eggers, and the latter did not seem to follow the royal orders. Kongsbakke's social status as a commoner (almue), his poor literacy, and his marriage to a possible native were a stumbling block for Eggers and his officers. In a royal letter dated 10 December 1670, both Kongsbakke and Eggers were reprimanded for their behavior, however, Kongsbakke's position as governor was reconfirmed. In a complaint against Eggers, Kongsbakke accuses him of insulting and making fun of his wife and writes bitterly: "That is the honor one gets for 5 years of service in Europe and 30 years in India". As the two continued to complain about the other, the King ordered a commission to decide the matter, and Eggers was subsequently sent to Copenhagen in 1672 to explain himself. Despite a lack of recognition from the other envoys from Copenhagen, Kongsbakke died at Dansborg in about 1674 and was buried nearby.

== Personal life ==
Scholars presume that Kongsbakke was married to an Indian woman, who colonial historian Kay Larsen claims to be the daughter of the local border guard (Nayak). However, Larsen also finds it possible that Kongsbakke was married to a Dane named Christine Andersen, who got all of her debt forgiven in a letter dated 8 December 1670.

There is no evidence of which languages Kongsbakke spoke besides Danish. However, he could likely speak some Portuguese, as it was widely used within trade and diplomacy in the region. The letter he wrote to King Frederick III was written in Portuguese.

== Legacy ==
Kongsbakke's story has given rise to heroic tales about his governorship and loyalty to Denmark. In 1907, Kay Larsen portrayed Kongsbakke as "the brave and loyal man who saved the fortress, town, and land for the Danes," but who died "neglected, humiliated, and decrepit." Only the Indian population continued to honor his memory. In 1980, historian Ole Feldbæk described Kongsbakke's deeds as an example of extraordinary loyalty and noted that "historical conditions can be more fantastic than fiction over historical events."

However, recent research suggests that Kongsbakke’s achievements are not as remarkable and heroic as previously claimed. Like other trading posts in the 17th century, Tranquebar was a multicultural enclave, and Kongsbakke may not have seen the lack of countrymen as a problem. Economically, it may even have been an advantage that ships from Copenhagen failed to arrive, as it was easier to make money by engaging in regional trade. Furthermore, Kongsbakke managed to utilize the differences between the Dutch and the Portuguese to his advantage.

== See also ==
- Bernt Pessart – 17th-century Danish governor and president of Danish India from 1636–1643
- Peter Anker
- Ove Gjedde's Expedition – 1618–1622 Danish expedition to Asia

== Works cited ==
- Bredsdorff, Asta (2009). The Trials and Travels of Willem Leyel. Copenhagen: Museum Tusculanum Press. ISBN 9788763530231.
- Sethuraman, N. (2016). The Danish East India Company From Establishment To The Epilogue (1616 – 1729) - A Historical Perspective. Salem: Tamil Nadu History Congress Proceedings.
- Gregersen, Hans (2018). Trankebar [Tranquebar] (in Danish). Forlag A/S. pp. 12–13. ISBN 9788711978337.
- Feldbæk, Ole (2010). Danmarks historie (in Danish). Gyldendal A/S. ISBN 978-87-02-10163-8.
- Dahl, Bjørn Westerbeek (1995). Magasin fra Det kongelige Bibliotek [Magazine from the Royal Library] (PDF) (in Danish). Copenhagen: Viggo Dalls Musikforlag.
- Larsen, Kay (1940). Guvernører, Residenter, Kommandanter og Chefer (PDF) (in Danish). Copenhagen: ARTHUR JENSENS FORLAG. p. 61.
- Liisberg, H. C. Bering (13 January 2020). Danmarks søfart og søhandel. Bind 1 (in Danish). Lindhardt og Ringhof. ISBN 978-87-26-30660-6.
