= Kavignar Meenavan =

- கவிஞர் மீனவன்
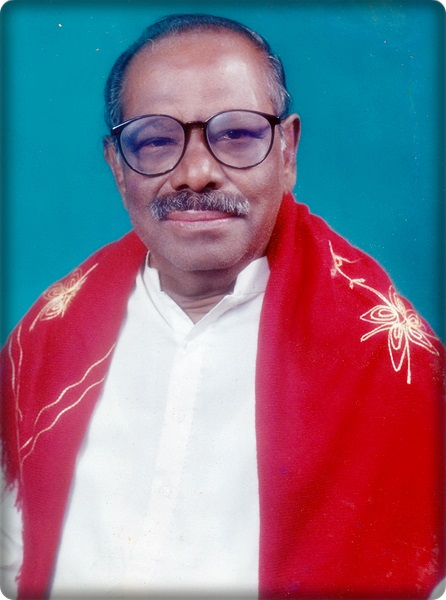
- Born: R. K. Narayanasamy; 9 January 1933; Tranquebar, Tanjore District, Madras Presidency, British India (now Tharangambadi, Mayiladuthurai district, Tamil Nadu, India)
- Died: 22 August 2012 (aged 79); Nagapattinam, Tamil Nadu, India
- Occupations: Poet, Writer, Scholar
- Spouse: Chandra
- Children: 4

Kavignar Meenavan (கவிஞர் மீனவன், 9 January 1933 – 22 August 2012), born R.K. Narayanasamy, was a Tamil poet, writer and activist. He was called Kavignar Meenavan by the people of Nagapattinam. He was a popular scholar and has written lot of poetry and research articles on Tamil language.

== Early life ==
He was born as R. K. Narayanasamy in Tranquebar to Kula Lakkuvan and Thailammai as a First child. Worked as a school teacher in different places, and retired as a Tamil teacher from National Higher Secondary School, Nagapattinam, Tamil Nadu.

He was a follower of 'Periyar' E. V. Ramasamy.

== Literary works ==
Kavignar Meenavan penned his works under different pseudonyms.

He wrote the following books:

1. Konjum Kulanthai கொஞ்சும் குழந்தை (a poetry collection)
2. Uzhaikkum Parithi உழைக்கும் பரிதி (a poetry collection)
3. Mutthiraikkumari முத்திரைக்குமரி (a poetry collection)
4. Sinthanai Sirpi Singaravelar Pillai Thamizh சிந்தனைச்சிற்பி சிங்காரவேலர் பிள்ளைத்தமிழ்
5. Pandaiya Thamizharum Parathavar Vaazhvum பண்டைய தமிழரும் பரதவர் வாழ்வும்

== Awards ==
- Awarded First prize for his Poetry Collection Konjum Kuzhanthai by Chief Minister Kalaignar Karunanidhi in the year 1975
