= Poul Hansen Korsør =

17th-century Danish merchant and governor of Danish India

5th Governor of Tranquebar
- In office 1648–1655
- Monarch: Frederick III
- Preceded by: Willem Leyel
- Succeeded by: Eskild Andersen Kongsbakke

Personal details
- Born: Unknown Korsør(?), Denmark
- Died: 1655 Tranquebar, present-day India

Military service
- Allegiance: Denmark–Norway ?–1655
- Battles/wars: Dano-Mughal War; Tranquebar Rebellion

Poul Hansen (Note: Danish: [pɒʊ̯l hansən]) (alternatively spelled Paul and Povl; later given the epithet Korsør; d. 7 September 1655) was a Danish governor of Tranquebar and colonial overhoved of Danish India from 1648 to his death in 1655. Korsør usurped the governorate from Willem Leyel by open mutiny, after accusing Leyel of purloining money from the Danish East India Company. During Korsør's tenure, the contact with Copenhagen was non-existent, and the Danes resorted to attempting to sell the colony to Brandenburg and the Dutch Republic.

== Epithet ==
In 17th-century Denmark, names were regularly patronymic, meaning one's surname was derived from one's father's name. This resulted in similar and sometimes identical names in Denmark, which other European colonists found confusing. Subsequently, when Poul Hansen arrived in India, his hometown would be added to his name per tradition. Poul Hansen, who came from Korsør in Zealand, consequently received the epithet of Korsør.

== Factor of Makassar ==
According to the governor of Danish India, Willem Leyel, in 1644, Poul Hansen Korsør was "old in India" (gamell udi India), and Korsør presumably came to India on St. Anna or St. Jacob. On 20 October 1645, Leyel appointed Korsør as factor of the Danish factory in Makassar, and Johan Polman as assistant factor. Makassar was an important trade center for the Danes, as Leyel desired to expand the trade of valuable goods with Manila. Consequently, Leyel requested the Danish King, Christian IV, to initiate negotiations with the Spanish to establish a trade connection between the Spanish and the Danish East India Company. As such, Korsør was told to consult with broker Francisco Mendes in matters relating to the Manila trade.

On 4 February 1646, Leyel revisited Korsør in Makassar, arriving on the Christianshavn. Leyel stayed here well into June and deposited goods worth 2277 pardous, which he had been unable to sell.

When the interim governor, Poul Nielsen, died in late January 1647, Leyel sent Anders Nielsen to Makassar to request that Korsør be acting governor of Tranquebar. Nielsen had a letter with him to Korsør from Governor Leyel:

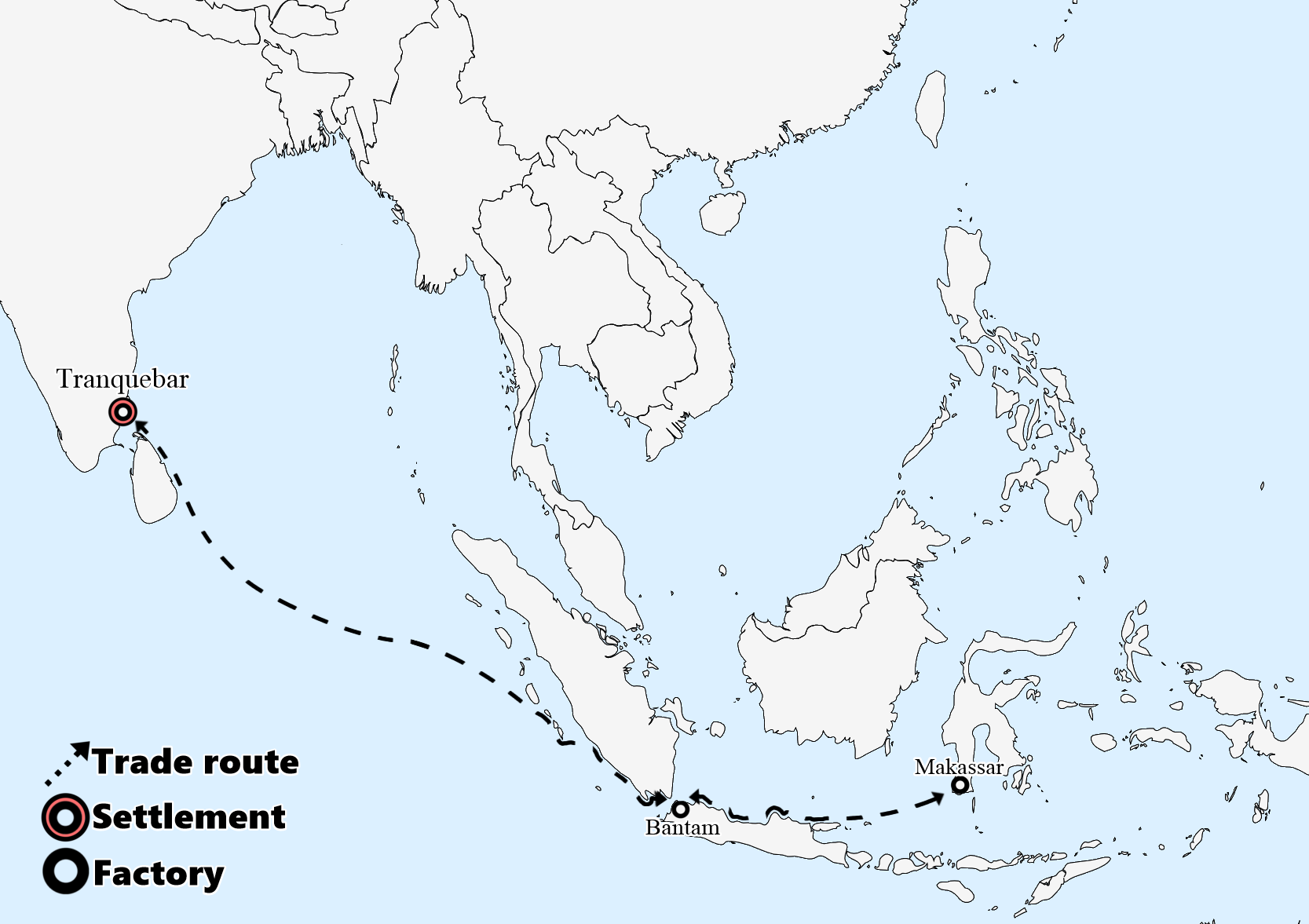
Settlements, factories, and trade routes of the Danish East India Company (1643–1669)

As Almighty God has called the late Poul Nielsen, merchant, home, and I lack persons here to whom I can entrust the fortress, should I travel to any other part of these countries, it is necessary that you and Johan Polman leave and come here with this sloop and do not leave any of our people behind

— Willem Leyel

Before Korsør left, he was to look for a reliable man to look after the factory at Makassar. However, despite Leyel's order, Nielsen refused to make the voyage to Makassar, and it is possible that this finally sparked a revolt against Leyel. Nonetheless, Korsør still left for Tranquebar in June 1646.

== Mutiny ==
Regardless of the unknown reasons for the revolt, there is no doubt that Korsør was the leader. Korsør maintained that Leyel had purloined money that rightfully belonged to the Danish Company. One day, when Leyel was absent, Korsør seized the opportunity to look through Leyel's papers and found a small account book. Korsør claimed that the book contained proof that Leyel had appropriated money belonging to the Company. He confronted Anders Nielsen and Jørgen Korsør with the account book, and as soon as Leyel returned from a voyage, they arrested him in the name of the King and declared that he had been relieved of his command at Fort Dansborg.

During the next few days, Korsør and other conspirators searched Leyel's room and papers to find enough evidence to incriminate him. When the evidence was secured, the conspirators drafted an indictment of Leyel and eventually sent him to Copenhagen.

== Governor ==
Korsør succeeded Leyel as governor of Tranquebar and would use unorthodox methods to preserve the colony. He began to capitalize on privateering expeditions, and many neutral ships were captured, as they were "presumed" to be hostile. During his tenure, the contact with Denmark was still weak, and the Company's ships and money became scarcer. In 1652, Tranquebar only had a couple of ships left, and the trade routes were almost completely interrupted.

In the same year that Korsør became governor, 1648, Christian IV died and was succeeded by Frederick III. The company was practically bankrupt, and there was no prospect of any economic improvement in the situation. The wars in Europe, and not least against the Swedish Empire, had emptied the Danish treasury, and there was no interest in sending year-long cargoes to Asia. In 1650, the Company was dissolved, and an attempt was made to sell Tranquebar to the Elector of Brandenburg. However, when the payment was not received, the deal fell through. Concurrently, Korsør unsuccessfully tried to transfer the colony to the Dutch, yet defensive walls were also being erected around Tranquebar. On 7 September 1655, Korsør died and was succeeded by Eskild Andersen Kongsbakke.

== See also ==
- Bernt Pessart – 17th-century Danish governor and president of Danish India from 1636–1643
- Anders Nielsen (colonist) – 16th-century Danish merchant and colonist
- Roland Crappé – 17th-century Dutch general and governor of Danish India

== Works cited ==
- Bredsdorff, Asta (2009). The Trials and Travels of Willem Leyel. Copenhagen: Museum Tusculanum Press. ISBN 9788763530231.
- Larsen, Kay (1940). Guvernører, Residenter, Kommandanter og Chefer (PDF) (in Danish). Copenhagen: ARTHUR JENSENS FORLAG. p. 61.
- Diller, Stephan (1999). Die Dänen in Indien, Südostasien und China (1620-1845) (in German). Otto Harrassowitz Verlag. ISBN 978-3-447-04123-2.
- Wirta, Kaarle (2020). Early Modern Overseas Trade and Entrepreneurship: Nordic Trading Companies in the Seventeenth Century. Routledge. ISBN 978-1-000-07906-7.
- Gregersen, Hans (2018). Trankebar [Tranquebar] (in Danish). Forlag A/S. pp. 12–13. ISBN 9788711978337.
