= Siege of Dansborg (1644) =

Siege in Tranquebar, India 1644

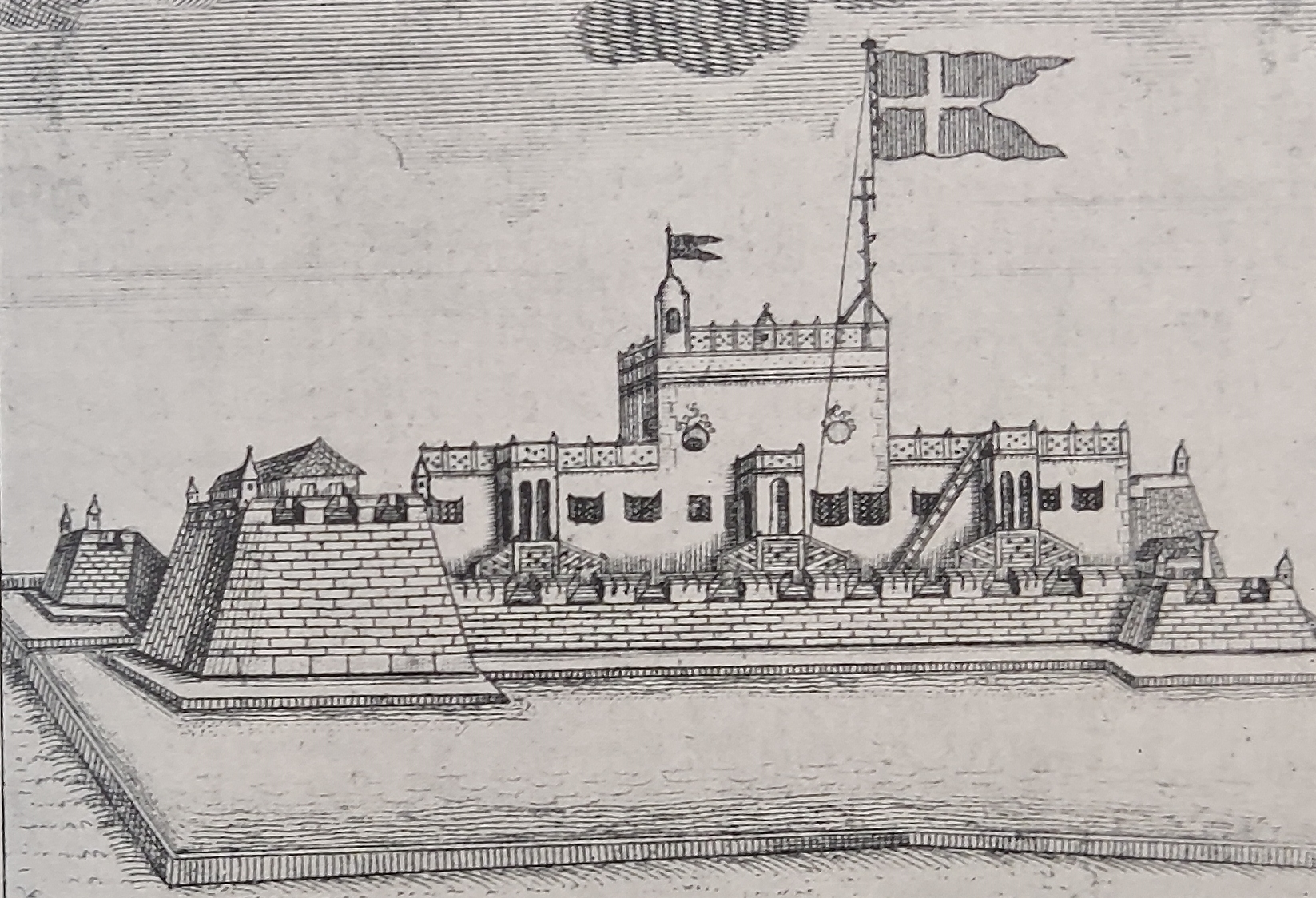
- Dansborg in 1777, Tranquebar
Date	20–30 December 1644
Location	Fort Dansborg, Tranquebar 11.03°N 79.84°E
Result	Inconclusive
Territorial changes	Status quo ante bellum

Belligerents
Danish India	Thanjavur Nayak; Supported by: (Dutch East India Company) Dutch India (Portuguese Empire) Portuguese Carical

Commanders and leaders
(Danish India) Willem Leyel (Danish India) Anders Nielsen (WIA)	Tiagepule; Regnapule

Strength
Unknown	Large

Casualties and losses
1 wounded	17 killed

The siege of Dansborg (Danish; belejringen af Dansborg) or the siege of Fort Dansborg (Danish; belejringen af Fort Dansborg), was a short siege lasting from 20 to 30 December 1644, between general Tiagepule of Thanjavur and the Danish command at Fort Dansborg. The conflict started over the Danish rejection of the general's demand to tax Tranquebar, and as a result, a series of confrontations followed. The confrontations had no major result, and an armistice may have been signed.

== Background ==
Danish India was established in 1620 at Tranquebar. A fort to secure the land and commerce in the area was constructed, given the name of Fort Dansborg. Tranquebar would go on to be the center of commerce and trade conducted by Danish merchants in the Bay of Bengal. Tranquebar was surrounded by the Thanjavur Nayak kingdom on land, and was to give an annual tribute to the Nayak, though this right to tax Tranquebar was quickly surrendered to the Danes.

=== Prelude ===
On 20 December 1644 the Thanjavurian general, Tiagepule, had appeared with a large army outside Tranquebar. He demanded 600 Danish rigsdaler from the Danes in Tranquebar as a present. Regnapule, a brother of the Thanjavurian general, was granted a lease of Karaikal and the southern region of Thanjavur in exchange fosustainedt of 900,000 rigsdaler to the nayak. As part of the agreement, Regnapule had the authority to levy taxes on the residents at his discretion in order to raise the necessary funds for the payment. However, the Nayak had previously renounced his right to tax Tranquebar, leading to rejection from the local inhabitants towards the general's demands.

Fort Dansborg

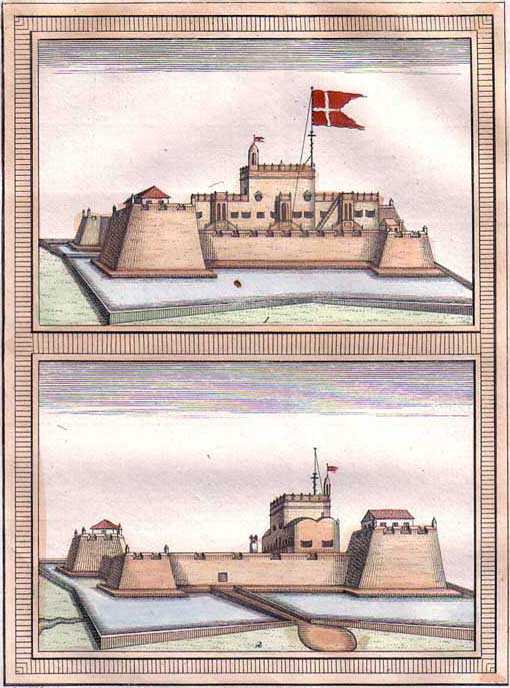
Views of the fort of Tranquebar, or "Dansborg", from Antoine François Prévost: Histoire générale des Voyages 15 vol. 1746–1759

== Siege and skirmishes ==
In response to the Danish rejection, General Tiagepule surrounded the town, resulting in the halting of commercial goods. This status could not be sustained for a long period of time for the Danes at Tranquebar, and therefore the commander, Anders Nielsen, subsequently made a sortie with his men and drove the Thanjavurians away.

A couple of days later, on Christmas, while the Christian Danes were attending church service, Tiagepule attacked the northern part of Tranquebar, burning numerous houses and taking a quantity of textiles belonging to the Danish East India Company. Nielsen remained in church until the sermon was over, yet directly after, he hastily assembled some of Dansborg's soldiers and again drove Tiagepule's army away.

The Thanjavurian army then launched a second attack during the night and burned a few more houses. In reaction, Nielsen collected a large company and at dawn the next morning the two opposing sides met in battle. The battle ensued for three hours. Tiagepule lost 17 men, while the Danes had one wounded, being commander Nielsen himself, who had a bullet strike his left arm.

== Aftermath ==
There seems to be no more skirmishes after this, and the belligerents may have agreed to an armistice. The reason that no skirmish occurred afterwards may be because of the Danish lack of gunpowder. At least on 30 December 1644 Anders Nielsen writes to William Leyel "you should know that we have no more powder in store."

=== Negotiations with the Nayak ===
Map

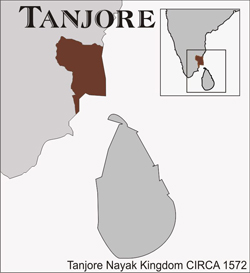
Approximate extent of the Thanjavur Nayak Kingdom, c 1572

Later, the nayak, Vijaya Raghava, sent a message to the Danes demanding they present him with gifts.

Notably the nayak suggested a suitable gift would be goods to the value of 8.000–10.000 Danish Rigsdaler. This value could not be gathered in Tranquebar, and the council at Dansborg therefore decided to send Anders Nielsen. With an Asian elephant, and other minor goods, such as silk and cloth, Nielsen led out for the Nayak. Nielsen was given a kind reception by the nayak, and the two then started discussing Tiagepule's attacks.

The nayak seems to have encouraged Nielsen to wait a couple of days for Tiagepule himself to arrive for discussing the war reparations. Yet, the nayak's emotions quickly changed and suddenly he demanded the Danes to, again, pay an annual tribute and additionally assist the nayak in his foreign wars. Despite complaining about the demands, Nielsen finally agreed to them and signed the agreement.

In the end, the nayak's anger seized, and he agreed to pay the damages for the destruction caused by Tiagepule.

== See also ==
- Dano-Mughal War – Danish colonial conflict against the Mughal Empire
- Cattle War – Conflict between Danish India and the Thanjavur Maratha kingdom
- Ove Gjedde – Danish nobleman and Admiral of the Realm
- Thanjavur Maratha kingdom – Principality in Southern India
- Dannemarksnagore
- Tillali Massacre – 1756 Massacre of Europeans in India
