= Tranquebar Rebellion =

1648 rebellion in Danish India

- Part of the Shipless Times
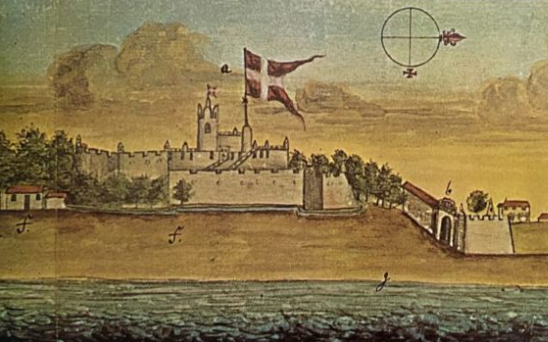
- The Danish trade station and fortress at Tranquebar, from the Embassy of Denmark in Bangkok.
Date	15 May 1648
Location	Tranquebar, Danish India (present-day Tharangambadi, India) 11°1′45″N 79°50′58″E
Action	Arresting the governor
Result	Mutineer victory
Territorial changes	Willem Leyel is replaced by Poul Hansen as governor of Tranquebar

Belligerents
Leyel loyalist	Mutineers

Commanders and leaders
Willem Leyel (POW); Claus Rytter; Herman Clausen	Poul Hansen Korsør; Frantz Erkmand; Anders Nielsen

Units involved
Christianshavn	Dansborg garrison

Strength
Minor	Majority of Danish officials

Casualties and losses
None	None

The Tranquebar Rebellion (Danish: Trankebar oprøret), also known as the Tranquebar Mutiny (Danish: Trankebar opstanden), was a bloodless mutiny and uprising against the governor of Tranquebar, Willem Leyel, at Tranquebar in 1648. The mutineers succeeded in arresting Leyel, and he would be replaced by the leader of the rebellion, Poul Hansen Korsør.

== Background ==
In 1639, experienced seafarer Willem Leyel was sent to Tranquebar on the order of Christian IV of Denmark to inspect the Danish East India Company's troublesome financial conditions, which had been caused by the current governor, Bernt Pessart. When Leyel arrived at Tranquebar, he would assume the title of overhoved after a brief siege on Fort Dansborg and began administering the Company's finances.

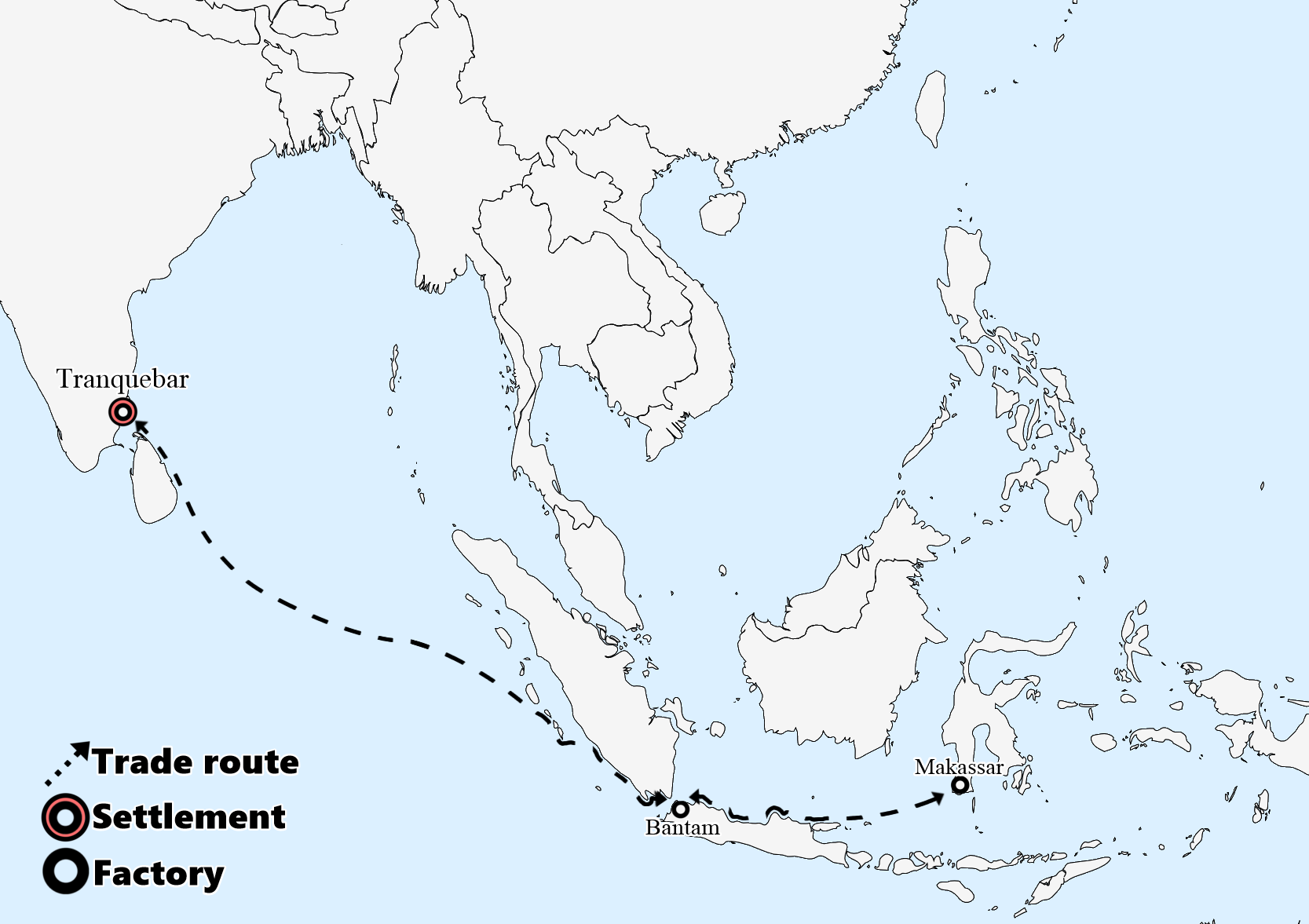
Settlements, factories and trade routes of the Danish East India Company (1643–1669)

Despite his seemingly positive regime, the inhabitants of Tranquebar were dissatisfied. However, there seems to be no clear explanation for this. The rebellion may have started as a result of the dissatisfaction with a peace treaty Leyel had signed with the Mughals. The treaty effetively ended the Danish privateers lucrative activities, perhaps the mutineers wanted the freedom to commit open piracy. It is possible that Leyel's attempt to force the acting governor of Tranquebar, Anders Nielsen, to go on a voyage to Makassar finally sparked the revolt.

== Rebellion ==
At any rate, soon after Leyel returned from a voyage, the rebels arrested him in the name of the King. The rebels were all men who had depended on Leyel, and it must be distressing for him to see his most trusted men go against him.

The conspirators searched his home and gathered all incriminating evidence in a small chest, in which they made they covering document that said:

The enclosed documents, papers, books, letters, and files are laid here just as they were found after the arrest of Señor Leyel, just as they are packed in this chest, small and big, bad and good, and nothing has been removed or added in any way that could serve to spare or blacken Señor Leyel. The only things removed from the said Señor Leyel's letters are the documents and letters necessary to demand the outstanding claims in various places, namely at Goa, Cochin, from Antony Carvalho, Joan del Meyda, and Roberto Wright

— Poul Hansen Korsør, Jørgen Hansen, Nicolaj Simonsen, Frandts Erkmand, Joannis Barnes

The document goes further to assert places and merchants to whom Leyel owed money, and despite Leyel defending his actions, the mutineers would not listen. The arrest must have been a terrible personal blow to Leyel, who had spent the last five years trying to make Denmark a commercial power in Asia. However, Leyel could not protest, and he would be sent home to Copenhagen on a Dutch ship.

== Aftermath ==
When arriving at Copenhagen, Leyel saw it necessary to clear his name and reputation. A case against Leyel was quickly abandoned for lack of evidence, and the new King Frederick III listened to Leyel's account of the conditions at Tranquebar.

In Tranquebar, Poul Hansen Korsør took command and resumed the lucrative privateering.

== See also ==
- Conflict between Willem Leyel and Bernt Pessart – Conflict and Danish civil war in India, between 1643–1645
- 1733 slave insurrection on St. John – Revolt in the Danish West Indies
- 1878 St. Croix labor riot – Uprising in the Danish West Indies
- Ambush near the Bay of Manila – Ambush of Danish and Dutch sailors in the Philippines, 1645

== Works cited ==
- Bredsdorff, Asta (2009). The Trials and Travels of Willem Leyel. Copenhagen: Museum Tusculanum Press. ISBN 9788763530231.
- Rindom, Jan (1995). Ostindisk Kompagni 1616-50 [East Indian Company 1616-50] (PDF) (in Danish). Copenhagen: Det Kongelige Bibliotek.
- Sethuraman, N. (2016). The Danish East India Company From Establishment To The Epilogue (1616 – 1729) - A Historical Perspective. Salem: Tamil Nadu History Congress Proceedings.
