= Subrahmanya Temple, Perambur =

Coordinates: 11.03°N 79.69°E

The Subrahmanya Temple is a Hindu temple dedicated to Murugan located in the town of Perambur, 14 kilometres from Mayiladuthurai. The principal idol of Murugan has six faces. There are plenty of snakes that occupy the precincts of the temple.
