= Anders Nielsen (colonist) =

16th-century Danish merchant and colonist

- Born: Denmark
- Died: Unknown
- Citizenship: Denmark–Norway
- Occupation: Employed in the Danish East India Company
- Years active: c. 1635 – 1650s
- Era: Age of Discovery
- Title: Governor of Tranquebar (acting)
- Term: 1643 – 1645
- Predecessor: Willem Leyel (non-acting)
- Successor: Poul Nielsen

Anders Nielsen (c. late 15th century (?) – 16th century) was a Danish colonist and acting governor of Tranquebar from 1643 to 1648, in times when overhoved Willem Leyel was absent. During his service as acting governor of Tranquebar, Nielsen would defend the town from Thanjavurian General Tiagepule and support a mutiny against overhoved Leyel.

== Early career ==
When Willem Leyel arrived with the Christianshavn in Tranquebar in 1643, Anders Nielsen is said to have been in India for eight years. Before 1643, Nielsen was appointed merchant by Governor Bernt Pessart at Masulipatnam. However, Nielsen did not care much for Pessart's drunkenness and was therefore appointed as merchant on the Gilded Sun by Claus Rytter on a voyage to Makassar in 1642.

== Acting Governor ==
On 4 September 1643, Leyel appointed Nielsen, whom he viewed reliable, as acting governor of Tranquebar whenever Leyel was absent. Nielsen became one of Leyel's most trusted men and proved to be very good and reliable.

=== Conflict with Carical ===
In October 1644, Leyel received a letter from Nielsen, in which he complained about a Portuguese attack on a sampan. Furious about the attack, Nielsen set off to Portuguese Carical in an Indian vessel with six men. However, because of heavy fire, Nielsen was forced to retreat. Nielsen then wrote a letter to the Portuguese authorities, asserting that he would revenge the attack as soon as possible. In response, the Portuguese governor of Carical replied that the Danes had seized a Portuguese vessel the year before, and that they merely wished to restore balance. Nielsen viewed this claim as nonsense and later sent Simon Jansen with the Valby to avenge the attack.

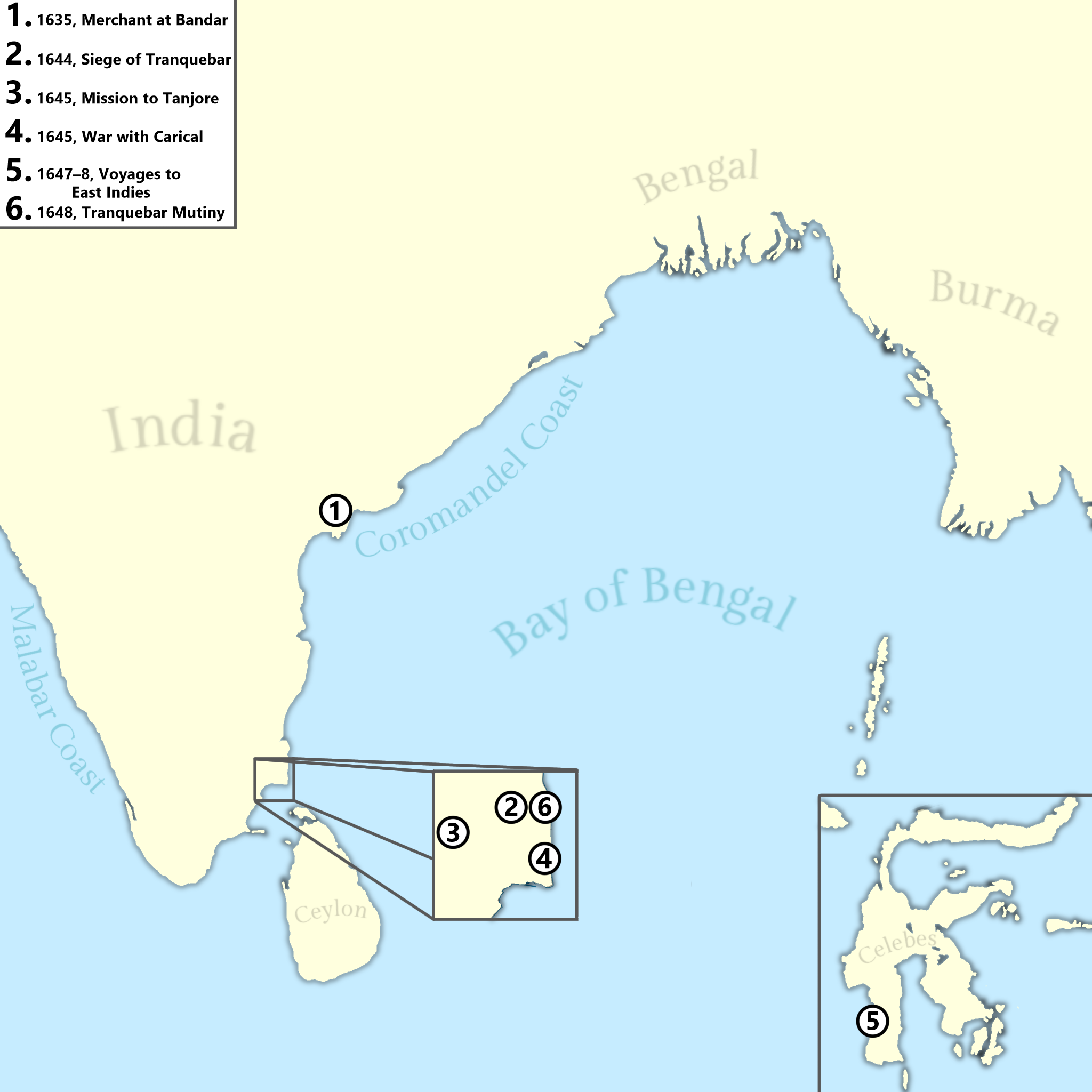
Key events in Anders Nielsen's career for the Danish East India Company (c. 1635 – 1650s)

=== Siege of Dansborg ===
In another letter to Leyel, dated 20 December 1644, Nielsen describes how an Indian general from Thanjavur had appeared outside Tranquebar with a large army, demanding that the inhabitants give him 600 rigsdaler as a present. Subsequently, Nielsen rejected this, and in response, the general surrounded the town. A couple of days later, on Christmas Day, the general attacked the northern part of the town burning several houses. Concurrently, Nielsen attended church until the sermon ended and hastily drove the general away. However, at night, the Indian army launched a new attack at night, and the two belligerents joined battle at dawn. In the ensuing three-hour battle, Nielsen got injured in the arm, yet managed to drive away the Indian army.

As a result of the siege and previous debts to the Thanjavurian Nayak, Nielsen was sent on a diplomatic mission to Tanjore. With gifts to the value of 3.000 rigsdaler and heavy negotiation, Nielsen managed to persuade the Nayak to give compensation for the general's attack.

In 1646, on Leyel's request, Nielsen bought an Indian vessel which was renamed the St Peter and St Paul. On 1 February 1647, the St Peter and St Paul, with Nielsen as merchant, went on a voyage to the Sunda Islands to purchase things they lacked in Tranquebar. A year later, in February 1648, Leyel once again asked Nielsen to go on the regular voyage to Makassar with St Peter and St Paul. However, Nielsen refuses as a result of previous experiences with voyaging after the monsoon. It is unknown whether Nielsen acceded to Leyel's request, yet it is possible that Leyel's attempt to make Nielsen initiate the voyage may have finally sparked a revolt in 1648. In the subsequent revolt, Nielsen and other officials arrested Leyel on the basis of their discontent.

== Works cited ==
- Bredsdorff, Asta (2009). The Trials and Travels of Willem Leyel. Copenhagen: Museum Tusculanum Press. ISBN 9788763530231.
- Bredsdorff, Asta (1999). Søhistoriske Skrifter (PDF) (in Danish). Vol. XXI. Copenhagen: Handels- og Søfartsmuseet Kronborg.
- Rindom, Jan (1995). Ostindisk Kompagni 1616-50 [East Indian Company 1616-50] (PDF) (in Danish). Copenhagen: Det Kongelige Bibliotek.
- Wirta, K.H. (2018). Dark horses of business : overseas entrepreneurship in seventeenthcentury Nordic trade in the Indian and Atlantic oceans. Universiteit Leiden.
