= HDMS Færøe =

Frigate

History

Dutch Republic
- Name: Agathe
- Launched: 1653
- Fate: Sold 1666

Denmark-Norway
- Acquired: 1666
- Renamed: Færøe (1667)

General characteristics
- Length: 119 ft (36 m)
- Beam: 27 ft (8.2 m)
- Propulsion: sail
- Complement: 197
- Armament: 40–42 cannon

The Færøe was a frigate constructed in the Netherlands in 1653 as the Agathe and purchased and renamed by the Royal Dano-Norwegian Navy in 1666. Although the vessel was named for the Faroe Islands, it is often erroneously "translated" as Pharaoh (Danish: Farao).

In 1671 and 1672, Færøe was the vessel used for the colonization of Sankt Thomas, the first surviving settlement in the Danish West Indies. Under the command of Captain Zacharias Bang, it was forced to put in for repairs at Bergen in Norway. The delay caused its support ship, the Den forgyldte Krone, to return to Copenhagen without meeting it. Færøe arrived and established its settlement on Skt. Thomas on May 25, 1672. From an original contingent of 190, – 12 officials, 116 company "employees" (indentured servants), and 62 felons and former prostitutes, – only 104 remained, 9 having escaped at Bergen and 77 having died in transit. Another 75 died within the first year, leaving only 29 to carry on the colony under Governor Jørgen Iversen Dyppel.
