= Tharangambadi =

Town in Mayiladuthurai district, Tamil Nadu, India

Tharangambadi Tranquebar
- Town
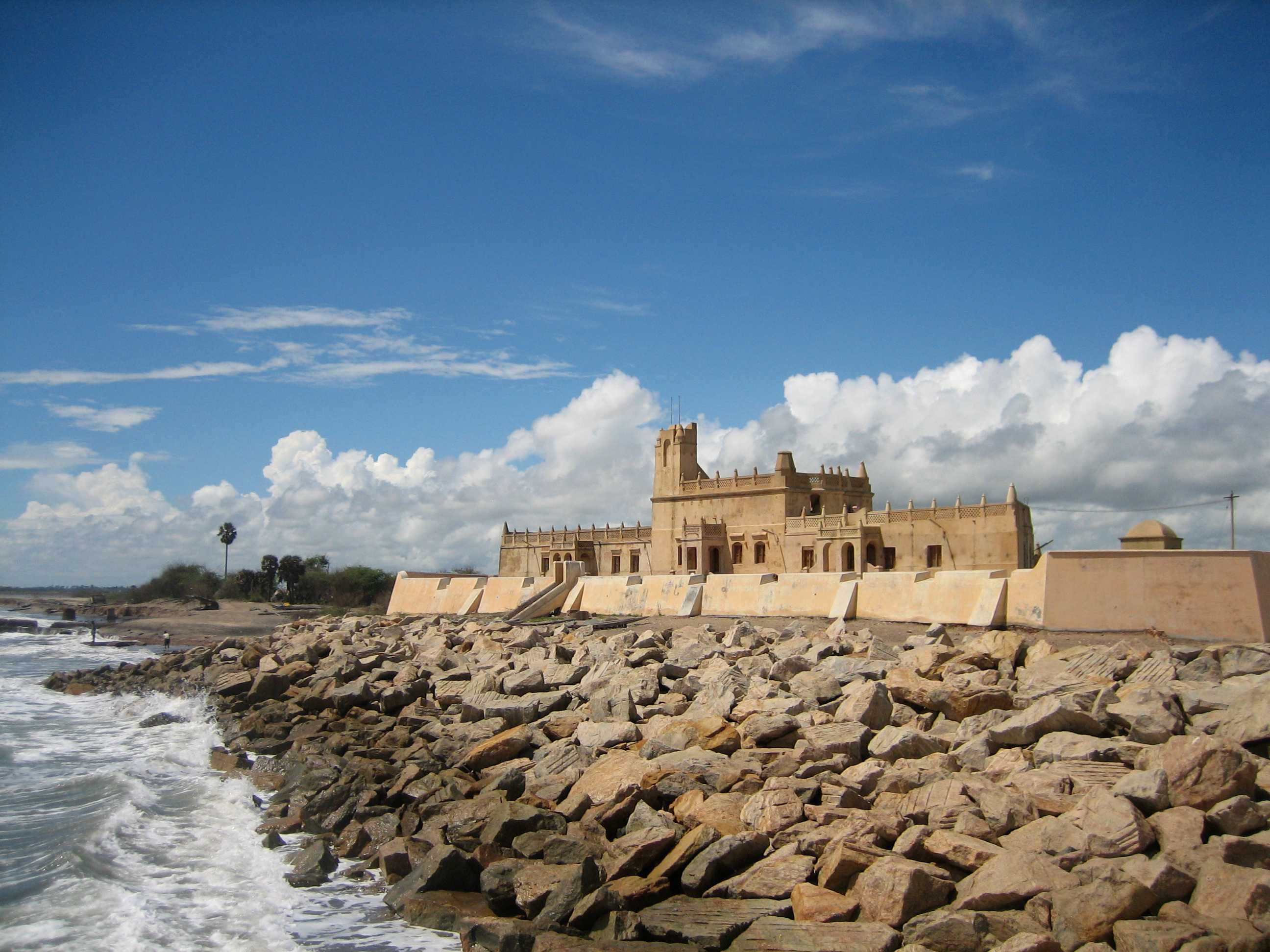
- Fort Dansborg, built by the 17th century as seen in 2007; part of the wall is now under the sea.

- Location within Tamil Nadu Location within India
- Coordinates: 11°1′45″N 79°50′58″E
- Country: India
- State: Tamil Nadu
- District: Mayiladuthurai

Population (2011)
  - Total: 23,191

Languages
  - Official: Tamil
- Time zone: UTC+5:30 (IST)
- PIN: 609313
- Vehicle registration: TN 82-Z

Tharangambadi (Tamil: [t̪aɾaŋgambaːɖi]), formerly Tranquebar (Danish: Trankebar, pronounced [ˈtsʰʁɑŋkəˌpɑˀ]), is a town in the Mayiladuthurai district of the Indian state of Tamil Nadu on the Coromandel Coast. It lies 15 kilometres (9.3 mi) north of Karaikal, near the mouth of a distributary named Uppanar of the Kaveri River. It was established on 19 November 1620 as the first Danish trading post in India. King Christian IV had sent his envoy Ove Gjedde who established contact with Raghunatha Nayak of Thanjavur. An annual tribute was paid by the Danes to the Rajah of Tanjore until the colony was sold to the British East India Company in 1845.

Tharangambadi is the headquarters of Tharangambadi taluk. Its name means "place of the singing waves"; the old designation Trankebar remains current in modern Danish. Tharangambadi is located at the distance of 285 km from Chennai. The nearest airport is Tiruchirappalli International Airport, 172 km away and the nearest port is at Karaikal at 26 km. It is served by Tharangambadi railway station.

== History ==
The place dates back to the 14th century. Masilamani nathar (Shiva) temple was built in 1306, in a land given by Maravarman Kulasekara Pandyan I. As of now, this temple is the oldest monument. Until 1620, when the Danes came, the place was under Thanjavur Nayak kingdom. Danish admiral Ove Gjedde felt the place would be a potential trading centre, made a deal with Raghunatha Nayak and built a fort, which is known as Fort Dansborg. In 1644, Dansborg was besieged, yet the siege became inconclusive.

A Jesuit Catholic congregation in Tranquebar predated the arrival of the Danes by several decades. This congregation descended from Tamil fishermen converted by Portuguese missionaries. There was also a sizable population of Indo-Portuguese due to their presence nearby in Nagapattinam. The Catholic church was probably demolished to build the fort. This fort was the residence and headquarters of the governor and other officials for about 150 years. It is now a museum hosting a collection of artifacts from the colonial era.

In 1639, experienced seafarer, Willem Leyel, was sent to Tranquebar on the order of Christian IV of Denmark to inspect the Danish East India Company's troublesome financial conditions. The Tranquebar Rebellion in 1648 may have started as a response to Leyel making a treaty with the Mughals to stop local Danish piracy. It was followed by a show trial that returned him to Denmark, and thus ending commercial oversight by the Crown. Two years later, Frederick III abolished the company. Although the company had been abolished, the colony was a royal property and still held by a garrison unaware of court developments back at home. As the number of Danes-Norwegians declined through desertions and illness, an illiterate commoner, Eskild Anderson Kongsbakke was loyal to his country and successfully held the fort until May of 1669; when the Crown dispatched the frigate Færø to re-establish an official outpost.

A view of the Danish settlement in Tranquebar with the Dansborg fortress in south east India, 1658

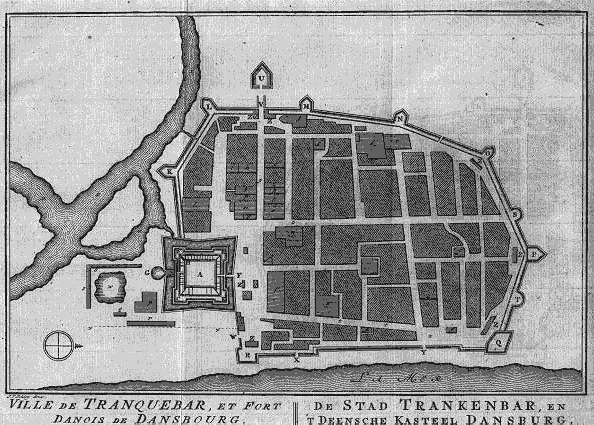
17th-Century Danish map of Tranquebar

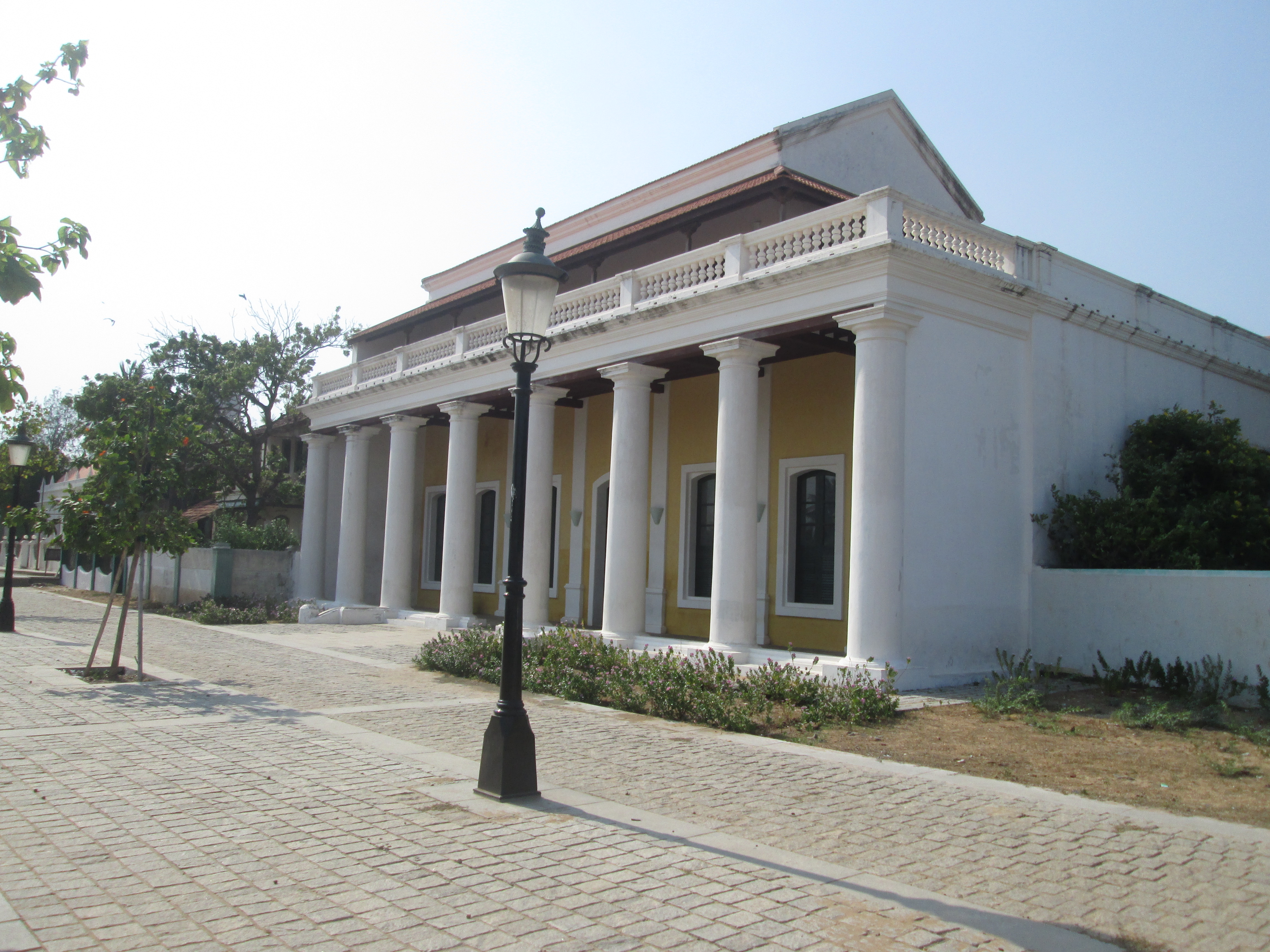
A restored colonial house in Tranquebar

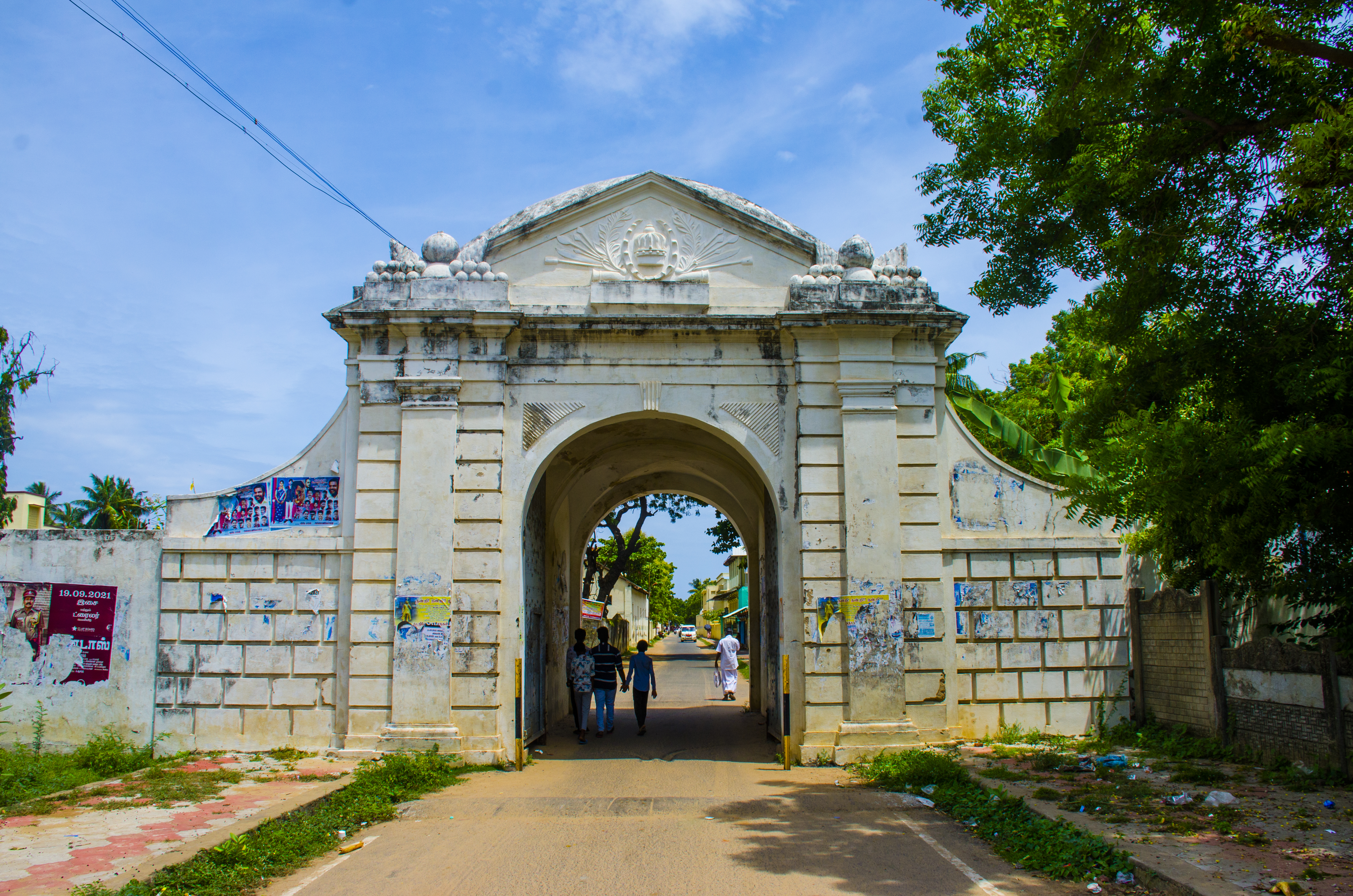
Town Gate

Among the first Protestant missionaries to set foot in India were two Lutherans from Germany, Bartholomäus Ziegenbalg and Heinrich Pluetschau, who began work in 1705 in the Danish settlement of Tranquebar. Ziegenbalg translated the Old and New Testaments into Tamil, imported a printing press, and printed the New Testament in Tamil in 1714.

Bible translations into the Tamil language started with the arrival of Bartholomäus Ziegenbalg at Tranquebar in 1706. He was a member of the Lutheran clergy who responded to the appeal of King Frederick IV of Denmark to establish a mission for the natives of Tranquebar. They also established a printing press, which within a hundred years of its establishment in 1712 had printed 300 books in Tamil. At first they only made little progress in their religious efforts, but gradually the mission spread to Madras, Cuddalore and Tanjore. Today Bishop of Tranquebar is the official title of a bishop in the Tamil Evangelical Lutheran Church (TELC) in South India which was founded in 1919 as a result of the German Lutheran Leipzig Mission and Church of Sweden Mission. The seat of the Bishop, the Cathedral and its Church House ("Tranquebar House") is in Tiruchirappalli.

The Zion church was consecrated in 1701, which is the oldest Protestant church in India. In 1718, The New Jerusalem Church was constructed. Moravian Brethren missionaries from Herrnhut, Saxony established the Brethren's Garden at Porayar near Tranquebar and operated it as a missionary centre for a number of years. An Italian Catholic Father Constanzo Beschi, who worked in the colony from 1711 to 1740, found himself in conflict with the Lutheran pioneers at Tranquebar, against whom he wrote several polemical works.

Tranquebar was occupied by the British in February 1808 during the Napoleonic Wars but was restored to Denmark following the Treaty of Kiel in 1814. Along with the Danish settlement of Serampore in Bengal, it was sold to the British in 1845. Tranquebar was then still a busy port, but it later lost its importance after a railway was opened to Nagapattinam.

The Subrahmanya Temple, Perambur, located in the outskirts of the town is one of the most prominent Murugan temples in the region.

== Demographics ==
As of 2001 India census, Tharangambadi had a population of 20,841. Males constitute 48% of the population and females 52%. Tharangambadi has an average literacy rate of 74%, similar to the national average of 74.5%: male literacy is 79%, and female literacy is 69%. In Tharangambadi, 10% of the population is under 6 years of age.

== Places and Monuments ==
=== Tranquebar Museum ===
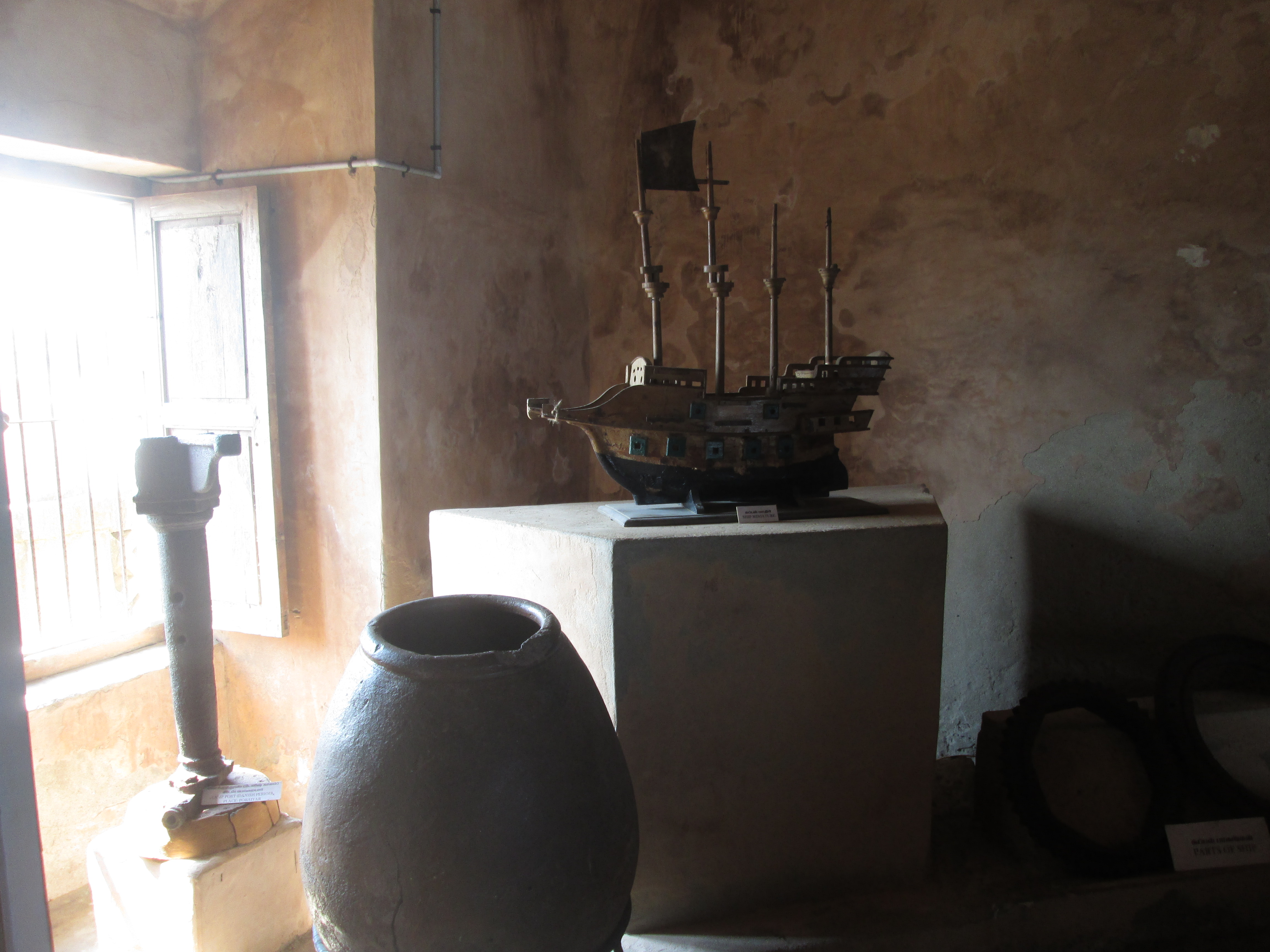
Antique items on display at the museum inside Fort Dansborg

The 17th and 18th century antiquities and relics from the Vijayanagara empire and Thanjavur Nayak kingdom, which authorised, allowed, and sanctioned the aforementioned Danish port township connected with the colonial period and Danish settlement at Tharangampadi are exhibited. The museum contains porcelain ware, Danish manuscripts, glass objects, Chinese tea jars, steatite lamps, decorated terracotta objects, figurines, lamps, stones, sculptures, swords, daggers, spears, sudai (stucco) figurines and wooden objects. There is also part of a whale skeleton, a giant sawfish rostrum and small cannonballs.

=== New Jerusalem Church ===
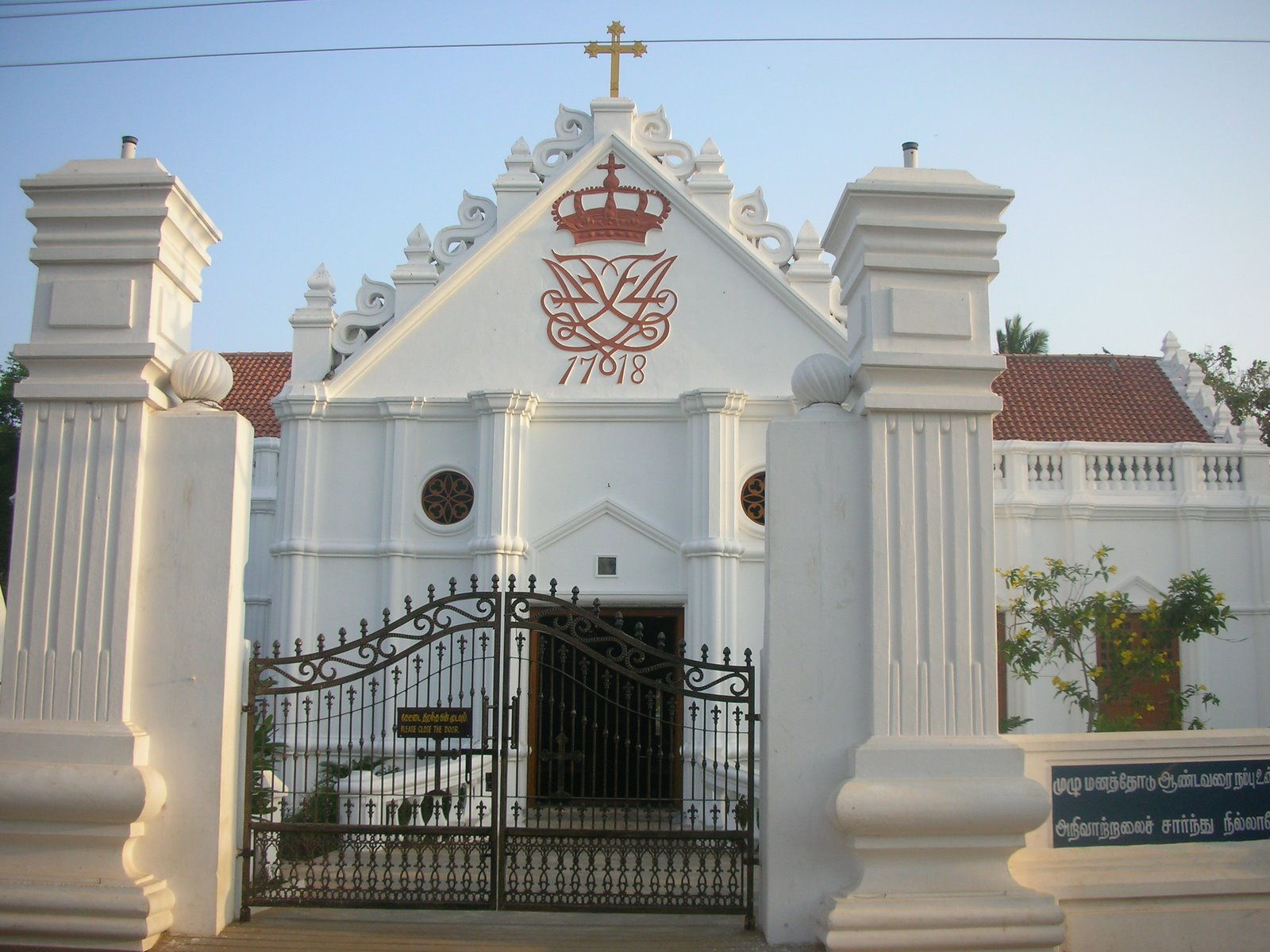
New Jerusalem Church, Tranquebar

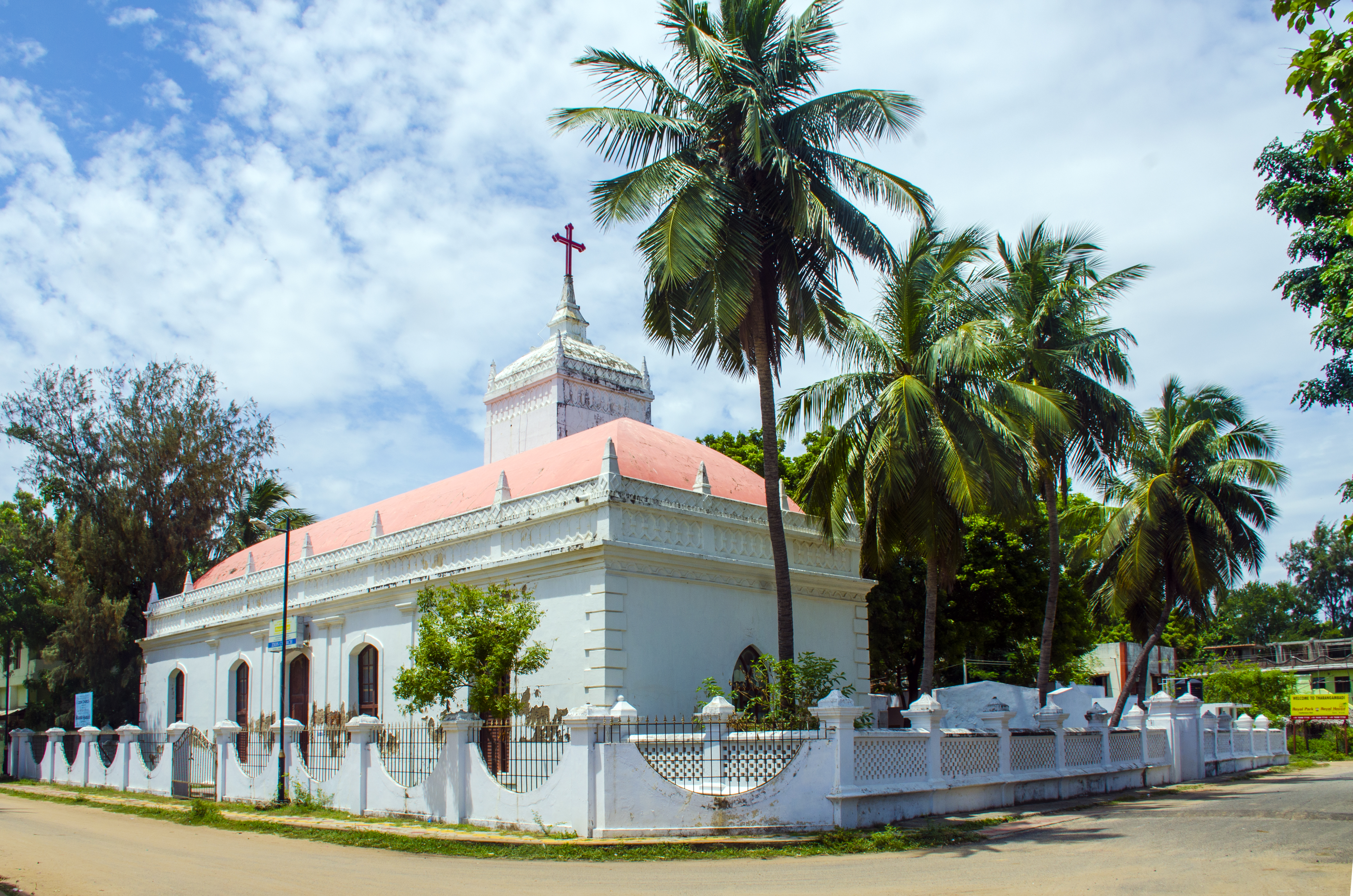
Zion Church

The New Jerusalem Church was built in 1718 by the Royal Danish missionary Bartholomaeus Ziegenbalg in the coastal town of Tranquebar, India which was at that time a Danish India colony. The church is located on King Street, and church services are conducted every Sunday. The church, along with other buildings of the Tranquebar Mission was damaged during the tsunami of 2004, and were renovated at a cost of ₹ 7 million, and re-consecrated in 2006.

=== Fort Dansborg ===
Construction of Fort Dansborg started in 1620. Many parts of the fort have been reconstructed several times. Dansborg is the second largest Danish fort ever constructed, with Kronborg in Helsingør being the largest. The rampart wall is a fairly large four sided structure, with bastions at each cardinal point. A single storied building was constructed along three inner sides of the rampart, with barracks, warehouse, kitchen, and jail. The rooms on the southern side remain in good condition, but the rooms on the western and northern sides have been substantially damaged. On the eastern side of the fort, there was a two storied building facing the sea. It was the main building of the fort. The vaulted lower storey served as a magazine and a warehouse, while the vaulted upper storey contained the church and the lodgings of the governor, the senior merchants, and the chaplain. The sea on the eastern and western side protected the fort. The fort was surrounded by a moat, access to the fort being over a drawbridge. The moat has completely disappeared. Today none of the fort's door openings and windows have doors in them. It is believed that during the end of their colonisation period, the Danish ran into financial issues. To make ends meet, they pulled out the metal doors, molded them into weapons and sold them.

== Notable people ==
- Kavignar Meenavan (1933–2012), Tamil poet, writer and activist
- Bartholomäus Ziegenbalg, reformer, credited with bringing out the first printed literature in Tamil

== Gallery ==
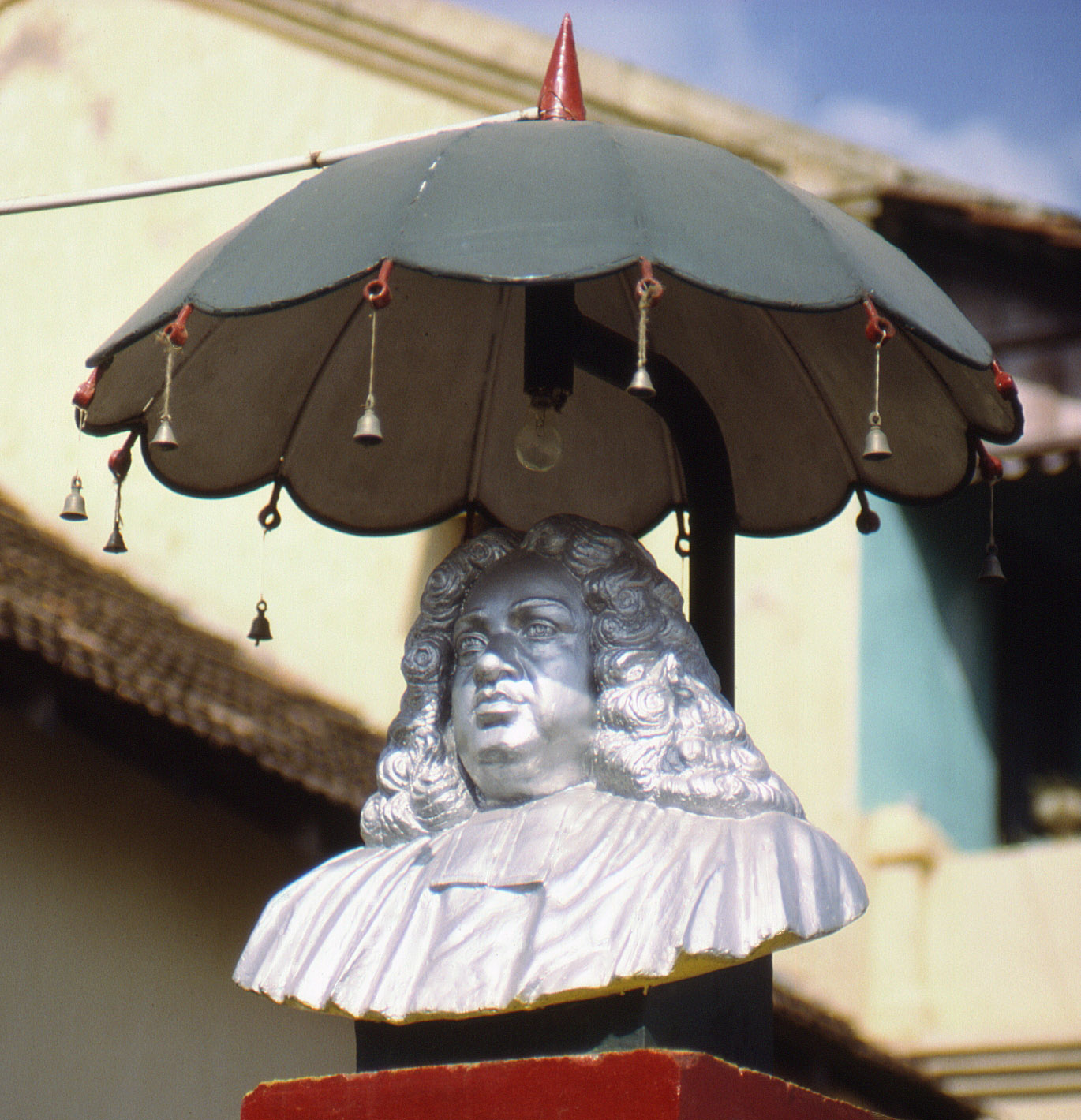
Bartholomäus Ziegenbalg monument

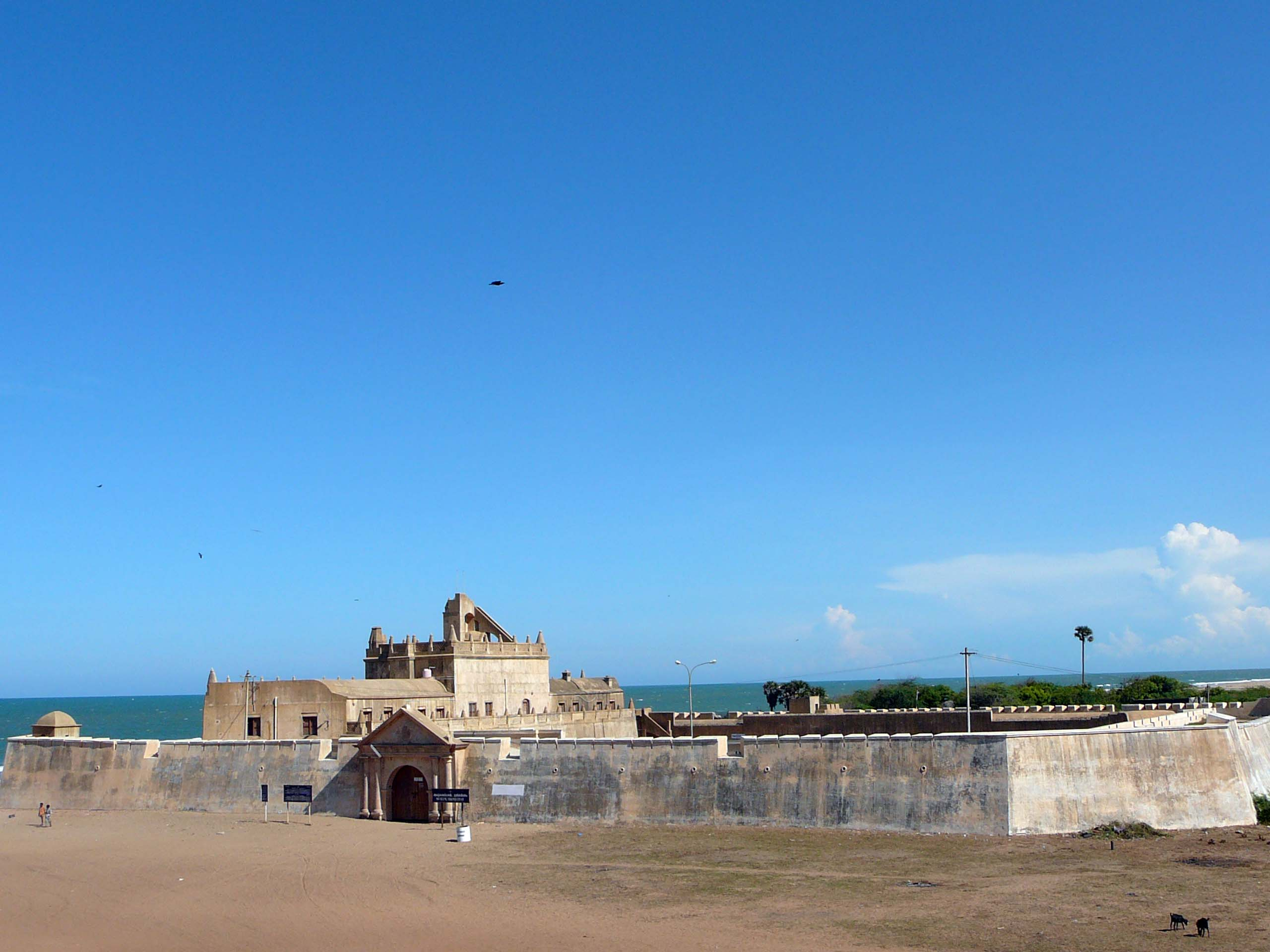
Fort Dansborg. Established in 1620 and partially renovated during 2002 by the Tranquebar Association. View from the governor's bungalow.

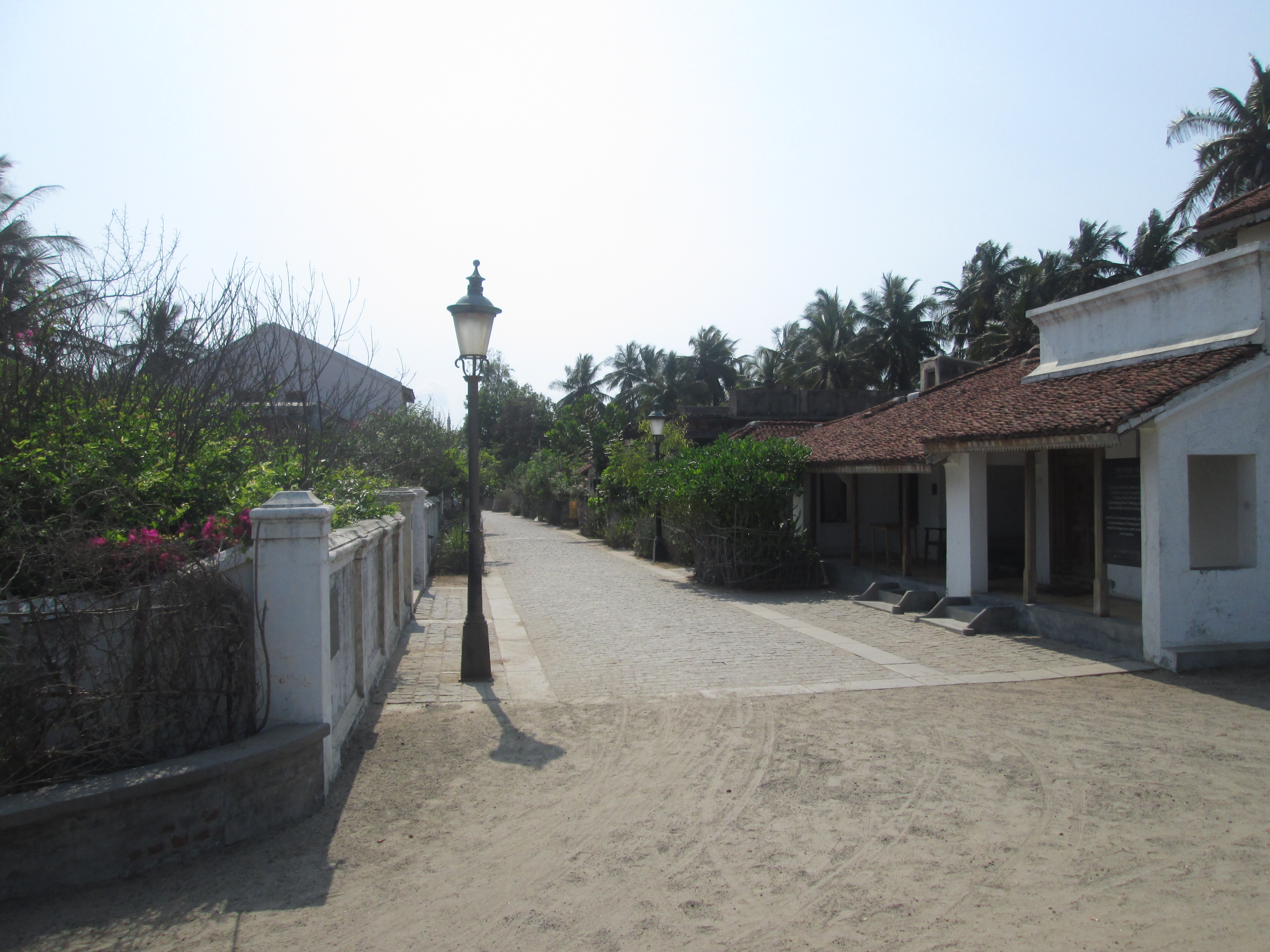
Goldsmith Street, now restored.

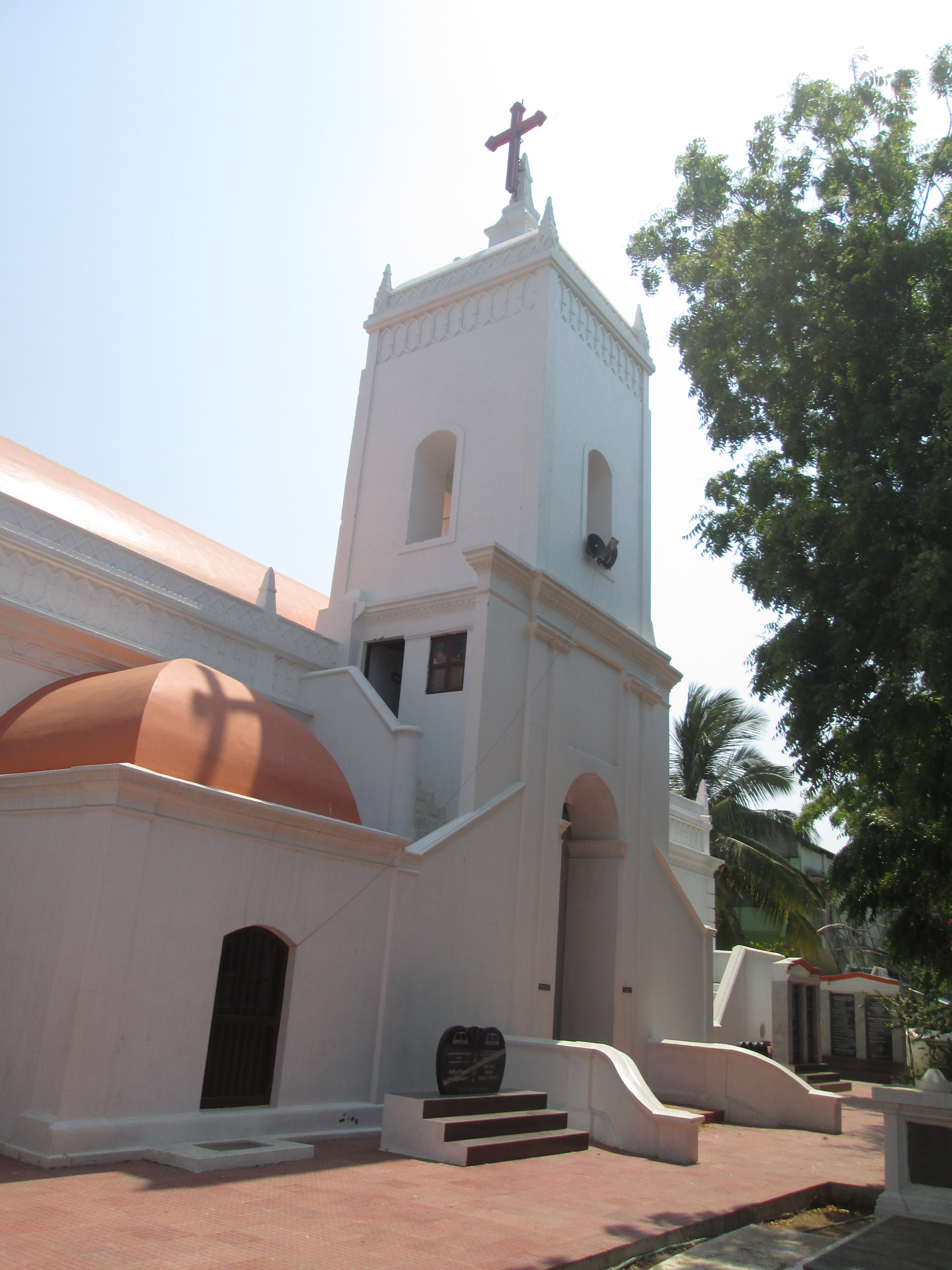
Zion Church

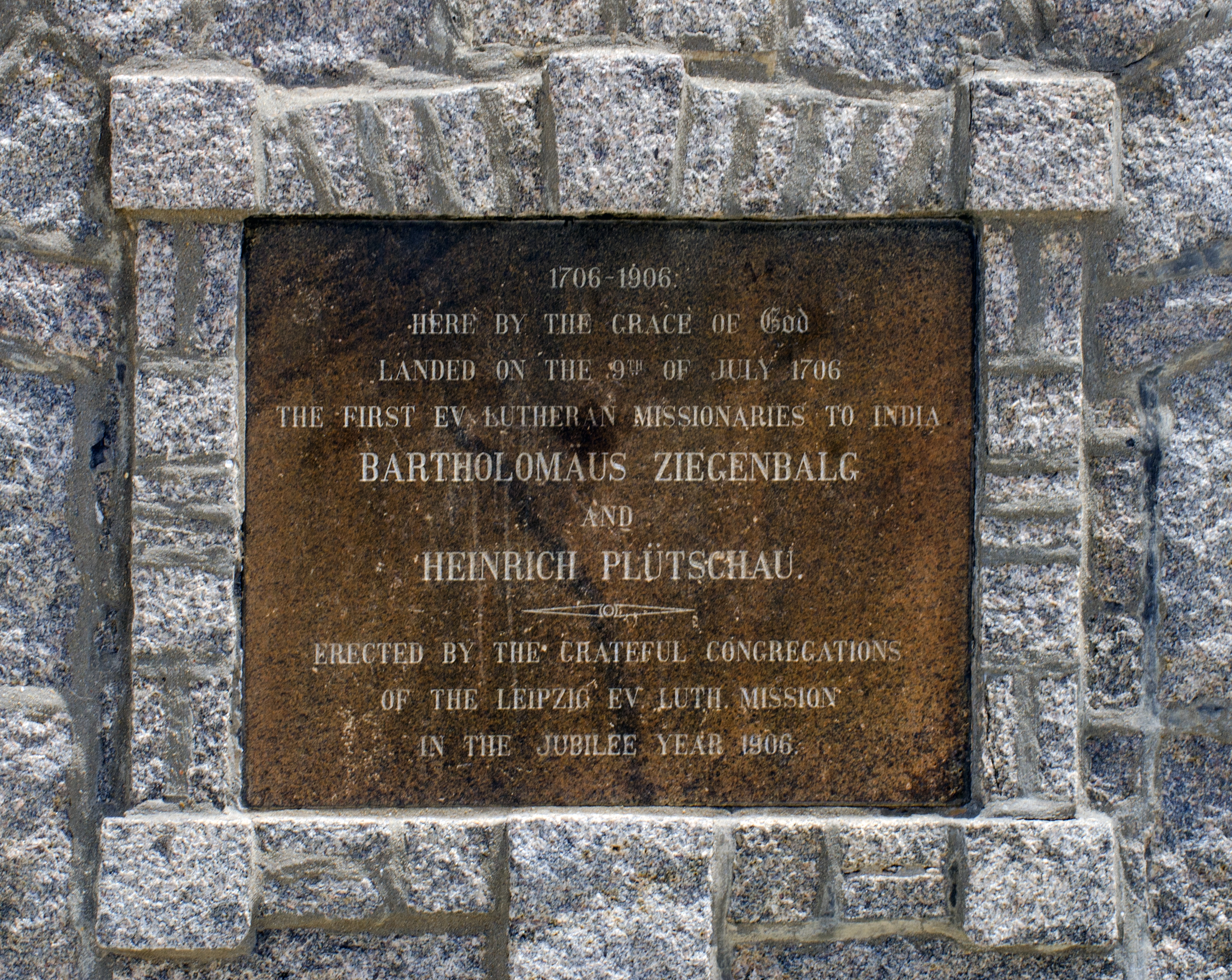
Ziegenbalg Landing Plaque

== See also ==
- Bartholomäus Ziegenbalg
- Danish East India Company
- Danish India
- European colonies in India
- History of Denmark
- Kulasekharapatnam
- Poompuhar
- Tiruchirappalli Fort
