= Ove Gjedde =

Danish nobleman and Admiral of the Realm

Ove Gjedde R.E.
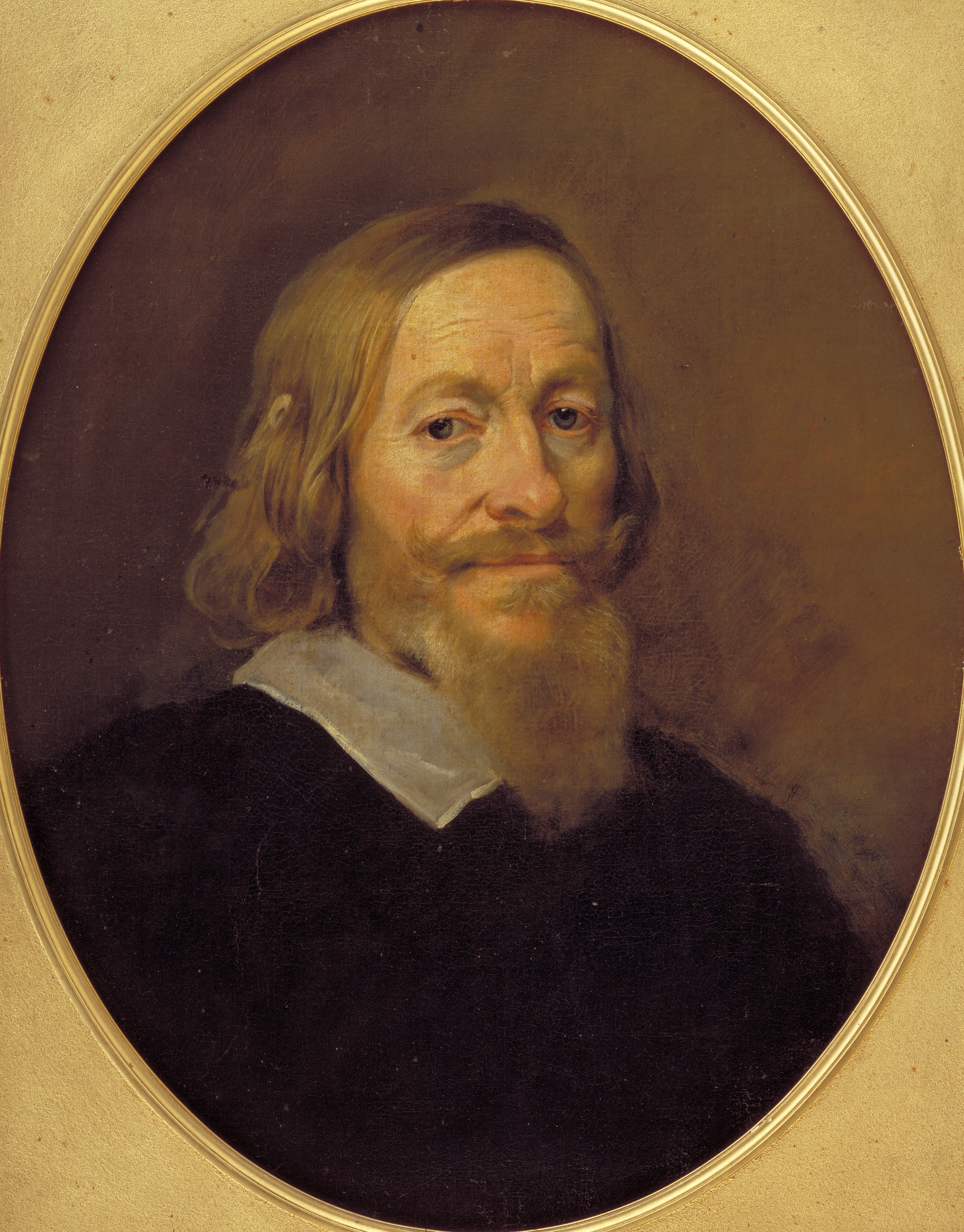
- Portrait of Admiral of the Realm Ove Gjedde, by Karel van Mander III

1st Governor of Tranquebar
- In office 11 October 1620 – 13 February 1621
- Monarch: Christian IV
- Preceded by: Office established
- Succeeded by: Roland Crappé

6th Admiral of the Realm
- In office 19 March 1645 – 19 December 1660
- Monarchs: Christian IV; Frederick III
- Preceded by: Jørgen Vind
- Succeeded by: Henrik Bielke

Personal details
- Born: 27 December 1594 Tomarps Kungsgård Castle, Denmark–Norway
- Died: 19 December 1660 (aged 65) Copenhagen, Denmark–Norway
- Resting place: Roskilde Cathedral, Denmark–Norway
- Spouse: Dorthe Knudsdatter Urne
- Children: Knud Ovessøn Gjedde; Brostrup Gjedde (see § Personal life)
- Parent(s): Brostrup Giedde; Dorthe Pallesdatter Ulfeldt

Military service
- Allegiance: Dutch Republic c. 1615; Denmark–Norway 1616–1645
- Rank: Admiral; Lieutenant Colonel
- Battles/wars: Siege of Braunschweig; Action of 19 February 1619; Ambush at Portudal; Torstenson War; Battle of Listerdyb

Ove Gjedde (Note: Danish: [o:ə gjəðə]) (alternatively spelled Giedde; 27 December 1594 – 19 December 1660) was a Danish nobleman and Admiral of the Realm (Danish: Rigsadmiral), who established the first Danish colony in Asia.

Born in Tomarps (Tommerup), Denmark–Norway, in 1594 to Brostrup Gjedde and Dorthe Ulfeldt, Ove Gjedde went to Sorø Academy from 1609 to 1612 and studied thereafter at various German universities. In 1616, Gjedde was employed in the Danske Kancelli (Danish Chancellery) and was ordered by King Christian IV of Denmark to lead an expedition to the East Indies in 1618. Gjedde arrived in Ceylon in May 1620 and negotiated trade agreements with Senarat of Kandy and Raghunatha Nayak, ceding the coastal towns of Trincomalee and Tranquebar to the Danish East India Company.

Gjedde returned to Denmark–Norway in February 1622, where he became lensmand (fief-holder) of Brunla and Numedal in the same year. He swapped this position with Tønsberg in 1637 and again with Bratsberg in 1640. Meanwhile, he took command of the Norwegian galley fleet, became land commissioner in 1639, and Oberstleutnant in 1640.

At the outbreak of the Torstenson War, Gjedde became admiral of a Norwegian fleet and in 1645 became a part of the Danish rigsråd (Council of the Realm), subsequently being appointed Admiral of the Realm. In 1646, Gjedde acquired Jungshoved, which he exchanged with Herrevad Abbey in 1649 and thereafter with Helsingborg. Concurrently, he became a part of the interim government that was put in place after Christian IV's death in 1648.

After the Treaty of Roskilde in 1658, Helsingborg was ceded to the Swedish Empire, and Gjedde received Hald fiefdom as compensation. Gjedde went back to Scania in 1658, but was captured and subsequently imprisoned by the Swedes. He was released in 1660 and came to Copenhagen swearing an oath to the new Danish constitution. He would die in September of the same year.

== Early life ==
Ove Gjedde was born on 27 December 1594, in Tomarps (Tommerup), Scania, Denmark–Norway, being the fourth son of Brostrup Gjedde and Dorthe Pallesdatter Ulfeldt. In 1609, 13-year-old Ove Gjedde went to Sorø Academy, obtaining his degree in 1610 and finishing at an age of 18. Gjedde continued his education for two years in the Holy Roman Empire, studying at Wittenberg, Jena, and Leipzig, taking degrees in fortification and law. After a short visit to Denmark, where he was informed that his parents had died, Gjedde went to the Netherlands and served the Dutch army, participating in the Siege of Braunschweig in 1615.

Gjedde possibly followed King Christian IV of Denmark back to Copenhagen, who had been present in Braunschweig for some time. Back in Denmark, Gjedde had various occupations, including being a secretary for Danske Kancelli (Danish Chancellery).

== Expedition to India ==
In 1616, the Danish East India Company was founded to initiate Denmark's involvement in Asian trade. As a result, the Company's first expedition to the East Indies commenced in 1618 with the aim of establishing a trading post. Despite Gjedde's lack of acquaintance with the navy, his business knowledge and loyalty to Christian IV earned him the leadership of the expedition.

=== Voyage to Ceylon ===
With over 400 men, 22-year-old Gjedde's fleet left Copenhagen on 29 November 1618, for the Kingdom of Kandy in Ceylon, by whom the Danes had been promised economic privileges if they managed to repel the Portuguese from the Island. After a brief stop in England, where Gjedde started to experience difficulties with the crew's discipline, the voyage continued across the Atlantic Ocean to the Cape Verde Islands. However, off Cape Verde, the Danish provisioning ship Den hollandske Fløjte was attacked by French privateers, yet Gjedde appears to have kept full control of the situation and successfully captured two privateering vessels.

In March 1619, the fleet stopped off the coast of Senegal to fetch water and firewood. The discipline among the crew was poor, and Gjedde's orders to protect against attacks were ignored, leading to an attack by natives. Consequently, the expedition lost 12 men, and Gjedde thus implemented stricter rules and harsher punishments for the crewmen. Furthermore, the lack of provisions also meant restrictions and the expedition suffered heavily from scurvy.

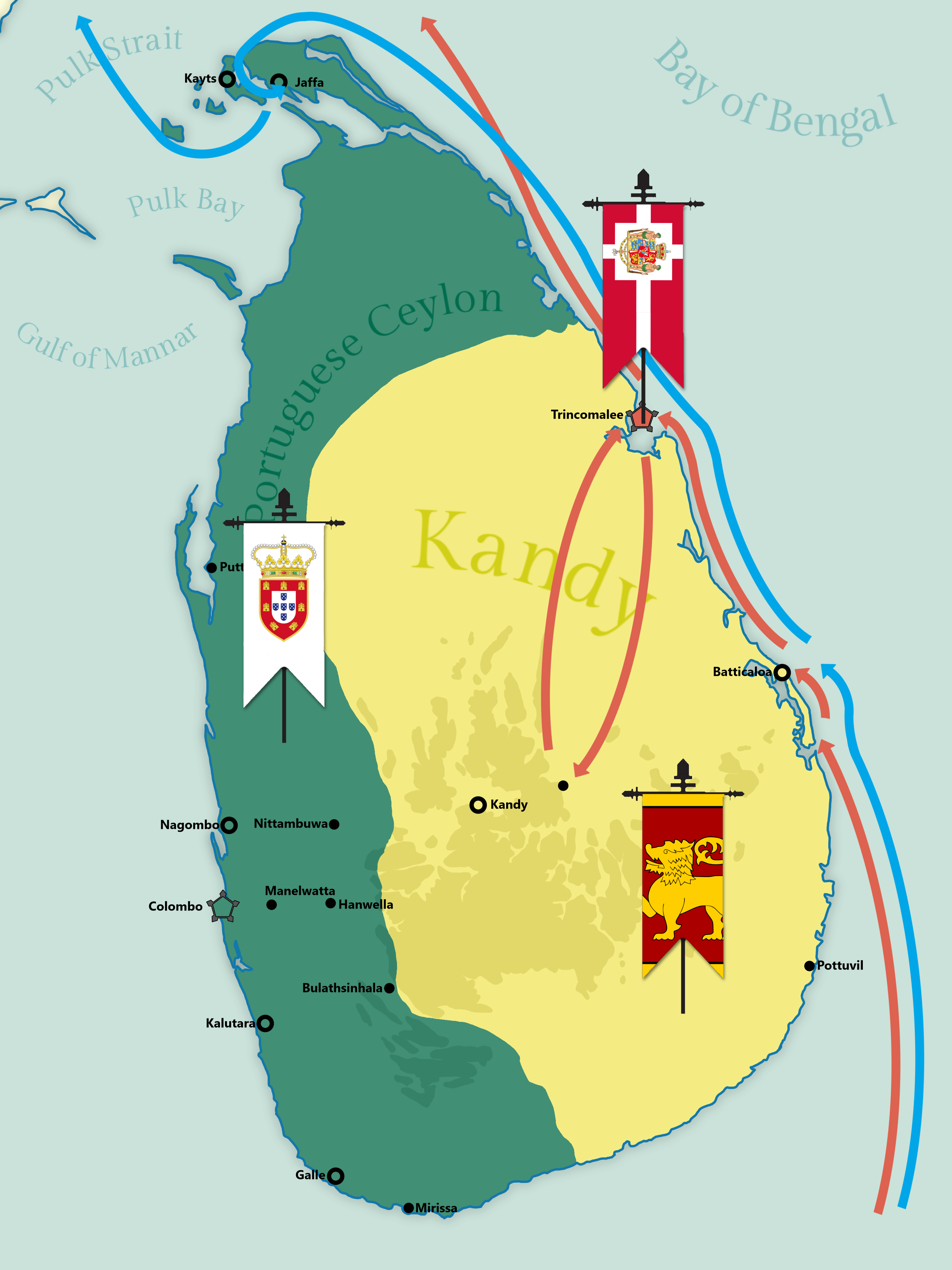
Ove Gjedde's expedition to Ceylon. Roland Crappé's navigations are shown in blue, while Gjedde's are shown in red

Three months after sailing from Cape Verde, the expedition reached Table Bay and the Cape of Good Hope. In the harbor of Cape Town, eight English ships were present, and good relations were soon established between them. The English captain allowed fresh supplies to be sent out to the Danes, and Gjedde was invited aboard the English admiral’s ship, which Gjedde later reciprocated on his vessel, the Elefanten, with a similar hospitality for the English. On 5 August, the voyage continued, sailing through the Mozambique Channel into the Indian Ocean, shortly visiting the Comoro Islands and Socotra before heading to Ceylon.

=== In the East Indies ===
On 16 May, Gjedde and his expedition got sight of Ceylon, and on 18 May parts of the fleet anchored at a place called Panva, 3 miles (4.8 km) from Batticaloa. Upon arriving, Gjedde now acted as an independent envoy and negotiator for securing a trade deal with Senarat of Kandy. However, Senerat had already concluded a peace treaty with the Portuguese three years before Gjedde's arrival, and therefore needed no help from the Danes. The treaty with the Portuguese made Senerat acknowledge Portuguese suzerainty over Ceylon, and Senerat could therefore not pay the amount of money promised to the Danes. For Gjedde and the Danes, this meant a depletion in their initial estimated capital, and Gjedde therefore threatened the Senerat if he did not comply. Eventually, Senerat agreed and on 21 August 1620, signed a new treaty, ceding the port of Trincomalee to the Danes and giving them generous commercial privileges.

From Trincomalee, Gjedde continued to the Indian peninsula, reaching Negapatam (present-day Nagapattinam) on 12 September. The next day, Gjedde went to a minor fishing village called Tharangambadi (Portuguese: Tranquebar), and with the help of Dutchman Roland Crappé managed to secure a treaty with the Nayak of Thanjavur, Raghunatha. According to the treaty, Tranquebar was ceded to the Danes for two years, and the Danes got the right to erect a fort there with the help of the Nayak's subjects. Gjedde immediately began the construction of the fort, which was personally designed by him. Following this, Gjedde began to prepare for the return voyage, which he would initiate in February 1621, when the fort was deemed finished. After giving a farewell speech, Gjedde left Tranquebar for Ceylon, where he found no colonial progress in Danish Trincomalee. Gjedde continued his voyage home, reaching Copenhagen on 4 March 1622, nine months after departing from Trincomalee.

== Civil service in Denmark and Norway ==
Gjedde had completed his mission satisfactorily, yet felt aggrieved by the Company, from which he had expected appreciation for his efforts. Instead, many viewed the expedition as a failure, as the treaty with the Kingdom of Kandy turned ineffectual.

In the same year as his return, Gjedde became lensmand (fief-holder) of the Norwegian districts of Brunla and Numedal, where he established Halsen Manor House in about 1630. Gjedde furthermore bought many farms and estates in the districts of Tjølling and Sandeherred, including Sandsvær and Eiker. Here, Gjedde invested in the Norwegian iron industry, becoming an inspector at Kongsberg Silver Mines in 1628. He supervised the construction of the mining operations and was, together with King Christian IV and Jens Hermansson Juel, a shareholder in the mining company, owning 25%. He had furthermore been elevated to director of the Kongsberg Silver Mines in 1630 and possibly participated in Fossum Ironworks since 1635. Additionally, he exchanged property to obtain significant forests, which he utilized to supply wood for the mines. In 1636, Gjedde fully took over Fussom Ironworks, together with his brother-in-law, Preben von Ahnen, and expanded the mine.

Gjedde lost Numedal in 1627 and switched Brunla with Tønsberg in 1637. During these years, Gjedde primarily resided in Tislegården, which was located near Kongsberg. Additionally, he also often resided in Sem Manor House, which was also the birthplace of his daughter, Regitze Gjedde. In 1640, Gjedde again switched fief to Bratsberg with the help of his relative Corfitz Ulfeldt.

=== Military officer and Admiral of the Realm ===
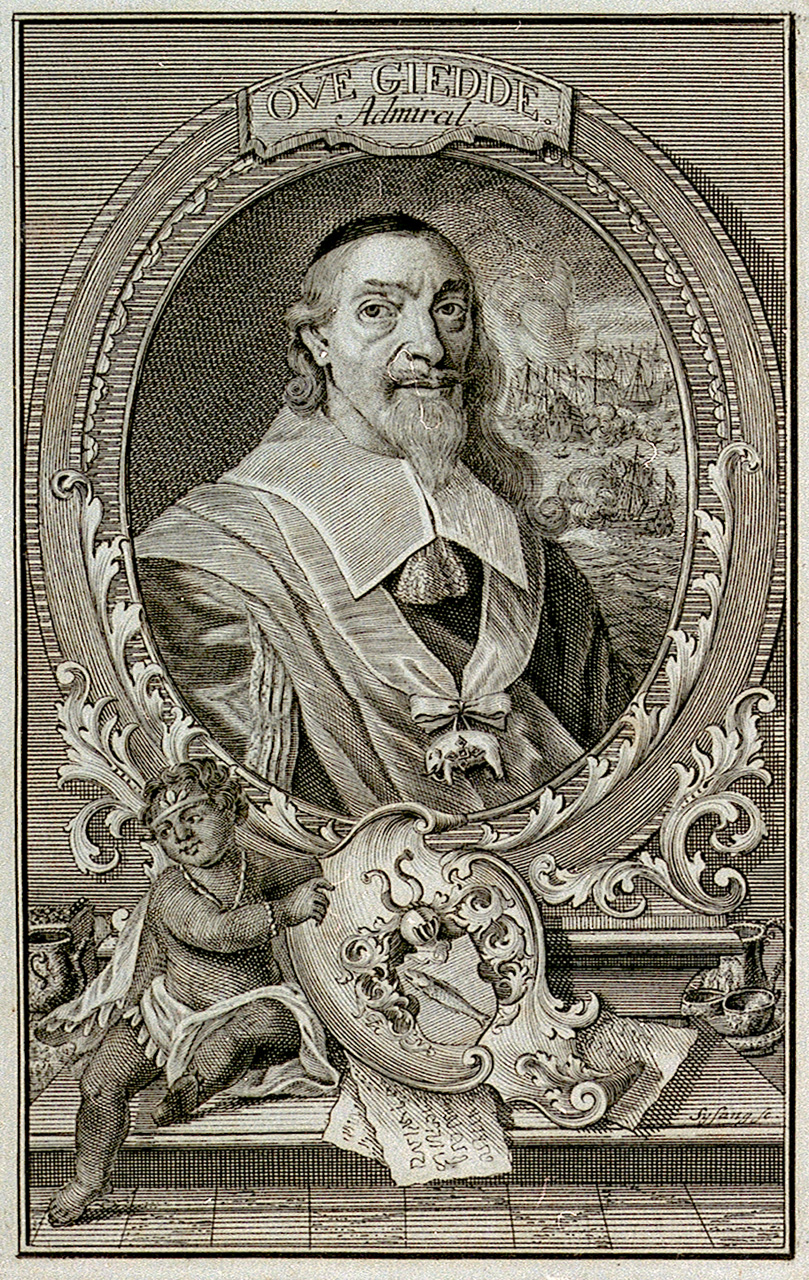
Portrait of Admiral Ove Gjedde by Johann Christoph Sysang

As fiefholder, Gjedde gradually took command over the Norwegian galley fleet from 1628 to 1629. Gjedde was also given the role of land commissioner of Norway in 1639 and Oberstleutnant of Akershus Regiment in 1640. At the outbreak of the Torstenson War, Gjedde became admiral over a minor Norwegian defense fleet in 1644, which was ordered to cross the North Sea to attack the Dutch. Subsequently, he combined forces with Pros Mund at Flekkerøy and met the Dutch in May 1644 at Lister Dyb. Following this, Gjedde was ordered to defend the waters between Norway and Jutland and to blockade Gothenburg. Fulfilling this order, Gjedde went to Gothenburg with a fleet of 6 warships and 10 frigates to blockade a Dutch fleet stationed there. However, Gjedde's ship, the St. Spohia, became stranded by a rock, and Gjedde subsequently broke his leg when jumping into a rescue boat. Three days later, Gjedde and his fleet came back to Copenhagen, and he did not participate in any other naval initiative that year. Despite this, he participated in the dismissal of unnecessary naval officers and in settling accounts with sailors.

After the war, Gjedde became Admiral of the Realm and a member of the Rigsråd (Council of the Realm), despite not having much experience. It is possible that his connection to the Governor-General of Norway, Hannibal Sehested, secured him these positions, and Gjedde was thereby one of Sehested's only supporters in the Rigsråd. In 1646, Gjedde was the leader of an expedition that was to transport King Christian IV to Norway.

== Later years ==
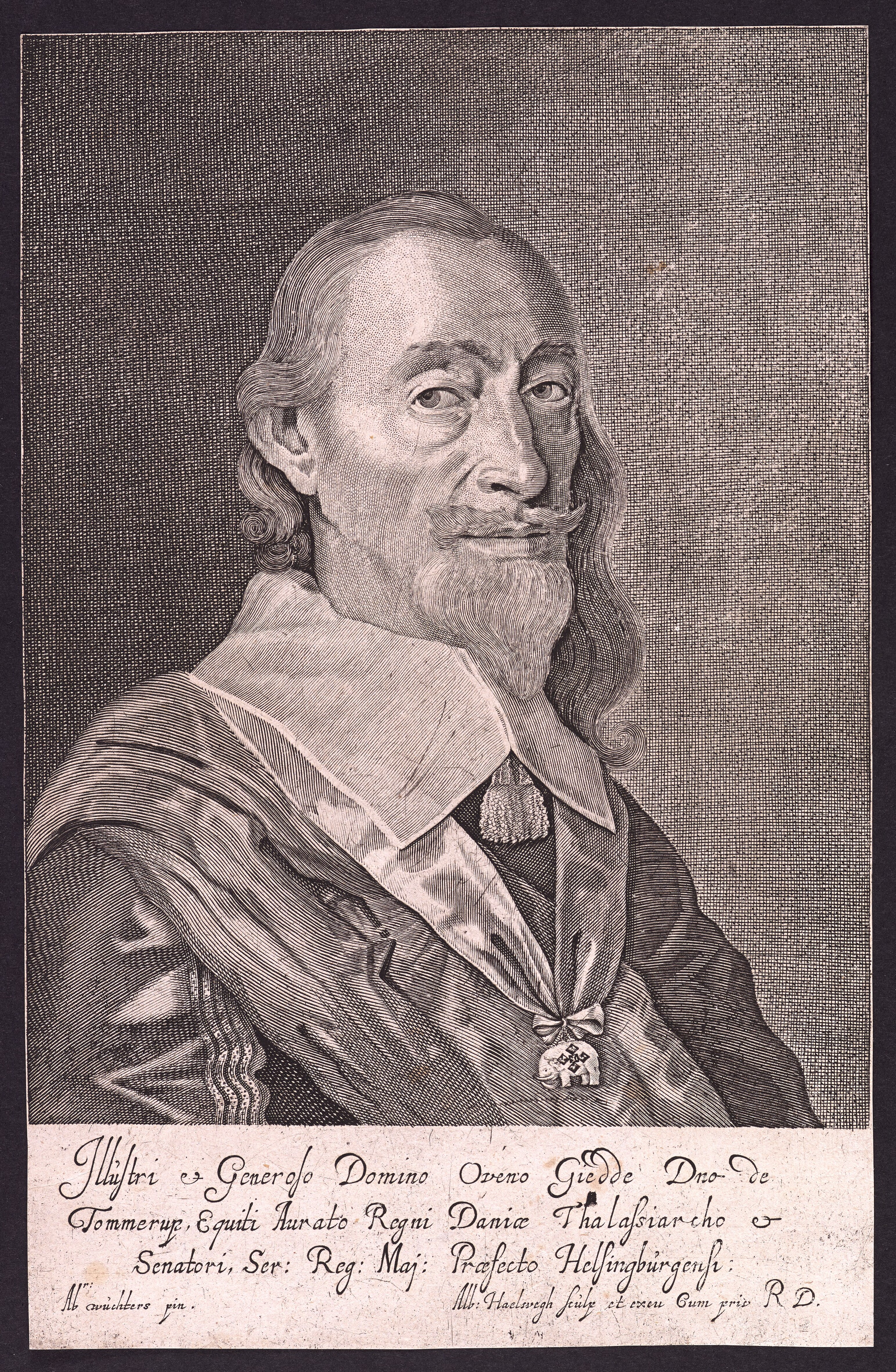
Portrait of Hjedde by Abraham Wuchters and Albert Haelwegh.

Norwegian estates. Gjedde had received Jungshoved in 1646, which he kept until 1649 when he exchanged it with Herrevad Abbey in Scania. The following year, Gjedde further switched Herrevad Abbey with Helsingborg and Kärnan. In 1650, Gjedde lost his last Norwegian fiefdom in Bratsberg, to Sivert Urne. However, as late as 1657, Gjedde and Ahnem established Ulefos Ironworks in Telemark, Norway.

After King Christian IV died in 1648, Gjedde was a part of a small interim government (regeringsrådet) that followed. It consisted of Gjedde and three other of the Realm's most prominent officials, all of whom were tasked with drafting a new Haandfæstning for the newly elected king, Frederick III. The interim government constructed the most restrictive Haandfæstning ever, which would eventually result in the introduction of absolutism in Denmark. In the same year, Gjedde undertook the command of a squadron that transported King Frederick III to Norway, for the country to pay homage.

At the same time, Gjedde had become weak and wished to resign as Admiral of the Realm, however, this demand was never met, despite him not having any special reputation. Gjedde had by this point closely aligned himself with Corfitz Ulfeldt and Hannibal Sehested, both of whom were embroiled in embezzlement lawsuits, which further weakened Gjedde's position. The Norwegian accounts from the Torstenson War were subjected to a critical revision, and Gjedde was accused of irregularities. The grounding of St. Sophia was furthermore blamed on Gjedde, who was to be compensated by 70,000 Danish rigsdaler. Despite Gjedde never being convicted, the mistrust continued, and a naval central administration (admiralitetskollegium) was established in 1655, possibly as a result of the mistrust. Additionally, he was not entrusted with any military command during the Dano-Swedish War of 1657–1658, only having a minor role of collecting money for the Danish warfare.

After the successful Swedish invasion of Denmark, Scania, including Gjedde's fief in Helsingborg, was ceded to Sweden in the Treaty of Roskilde. In compensation, Gjedde received Hald fiefdom, south of Viborg, yet was quickly back in Helsingborg to manage some accounts. However, as the Swedish king, Charles X Gustav, broke the peace in 1658, Gjedde subsequently in hostile territory and was quickly imprisoned. He was first imprisoned in Helsingborg, but later moved to Malmö, where he resumed relations with Corfitz Ulfeldt, who loaned Gjedde money. After two years, Gjedde was released in September 1660 and subsequently came to Copenhagen, where he would swear an oath to the new Danish constitution. On 19 December the same year, Gjedde would die in Sokkelund at the age of 65.

== Personal life ==
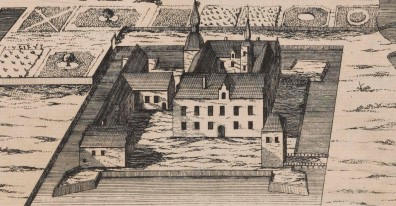
Tomarps Kungsgård in 1680, by Burman & Fischer after the Swedish takeover of Scania

Gjedde was married on 1 September 1622 at Kronborg to Dorthe Knudsdatter Urne at the age of 27. Dorthe was the sister of the Governor-General of Norway, Christoffer Urne, and district governor Preben von Ahnen, the latter of whom Gjedde constructed various ironworks with. Together, Gjedde and Dorthe had 12 children, most notably Knud Ovessøn Gjedde and Brostrup Gjedde, both of whom served as county governors in Norway. Gjedde furthermore managed to get Bostrup a mining education, resulting in Bostrup getting a leading position in Norwegian mining administration.

In addition to Gjedde's estates and manors in Norway, Gjedde also lived in his birthplace, Tomarps Kungsgård, which, according to archaeological studies, underwent major changes went Gjedde lived there.

He owned a number of properties in Copenhagen. His city home was an impressive, no longer existing house where Gammel Mønt runs today. He also owned another large property, Kanslergården, between Store Kannikestræde and Skidenstræde. This property was later owned first by Holger Vind, his son-in-law, and then by his son Frederik Gjedde. The building at Store Kannikestræde 10 is now known as Admiral Gjheddes Gård (Admiral Gjedde's House), rather misleadingly, considering that it was constructed after the Copenhagen Fire of 1728 and thus approximately 70 years after his death.

== Legacy ==
Ove Gjedde is one of the first Danes to experience globalization, and lived a life intertwined with colonialism, globalization, mercantilism, and capitalism. Gjedde's main achievement was his voyage to India and the subsequent founding of Tranquebar, which is glorified by a couple of books published by Gjedde himself. Later Dano-Norwegian writer, Ludvig Holberg, notes that the habit of drinking tea in Denmark was introduced by Ove Gjedde. In contrast, Gjedde's part in the mining industry is downplayed and rarely mentioned, notwithstanding the big role silver had in Gjedde's life.

Despite the founding of Tranquebar generally being regarded as Gjedde's achievement, his companion and later governor of Danish India, Roland Crappé, was more successful conducting negotiations with the Nayak of Thanjavur. Furthermore, Gjedde often ends up in the shadow of more famous people of the time, such as Jens Munk, Claus Daa, and Cotfitz Utfeldt.

== Gallery ==
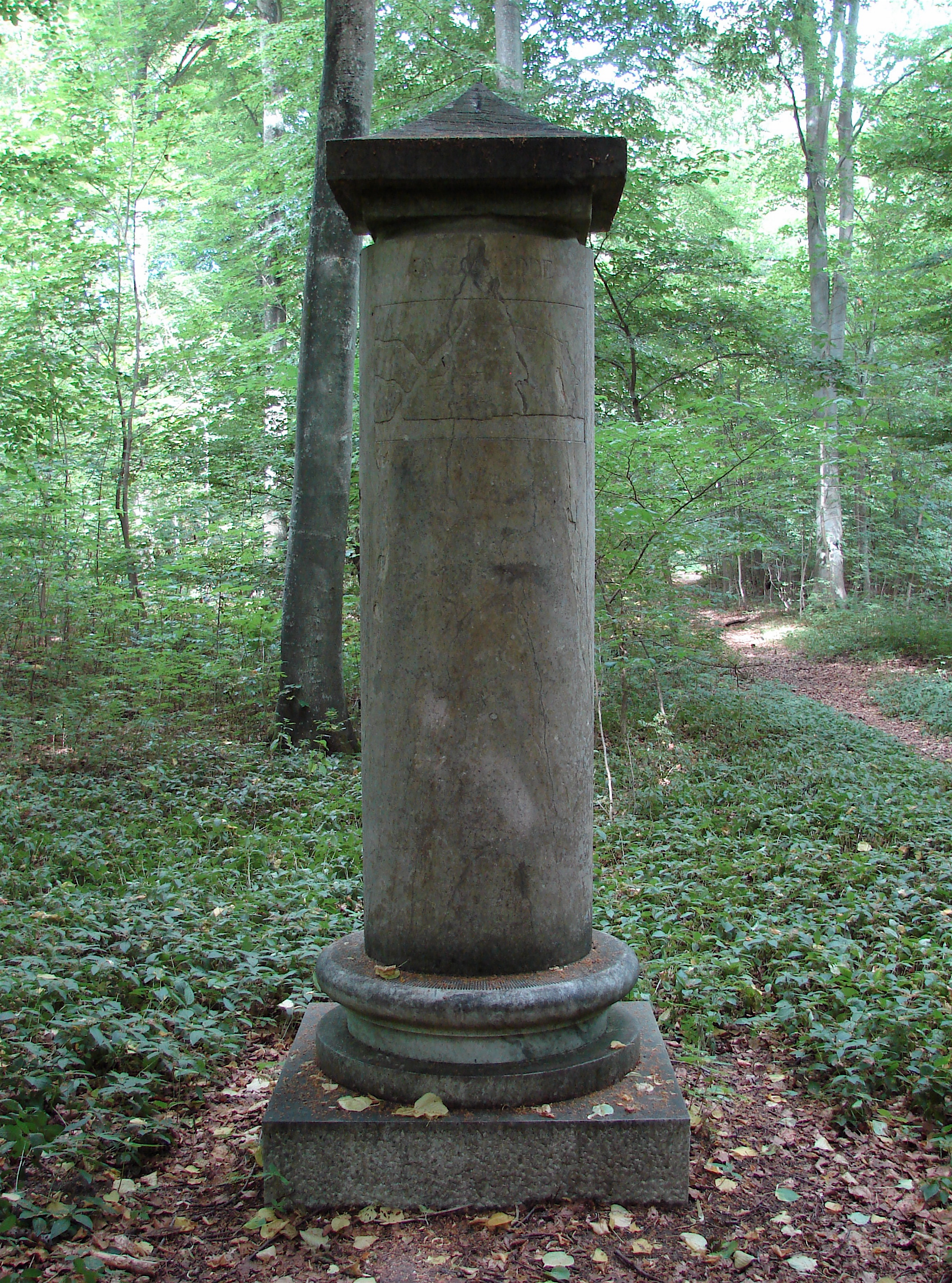
Memorial stone for Ove Gjedde, made from marble by Johannes Wiedewelt

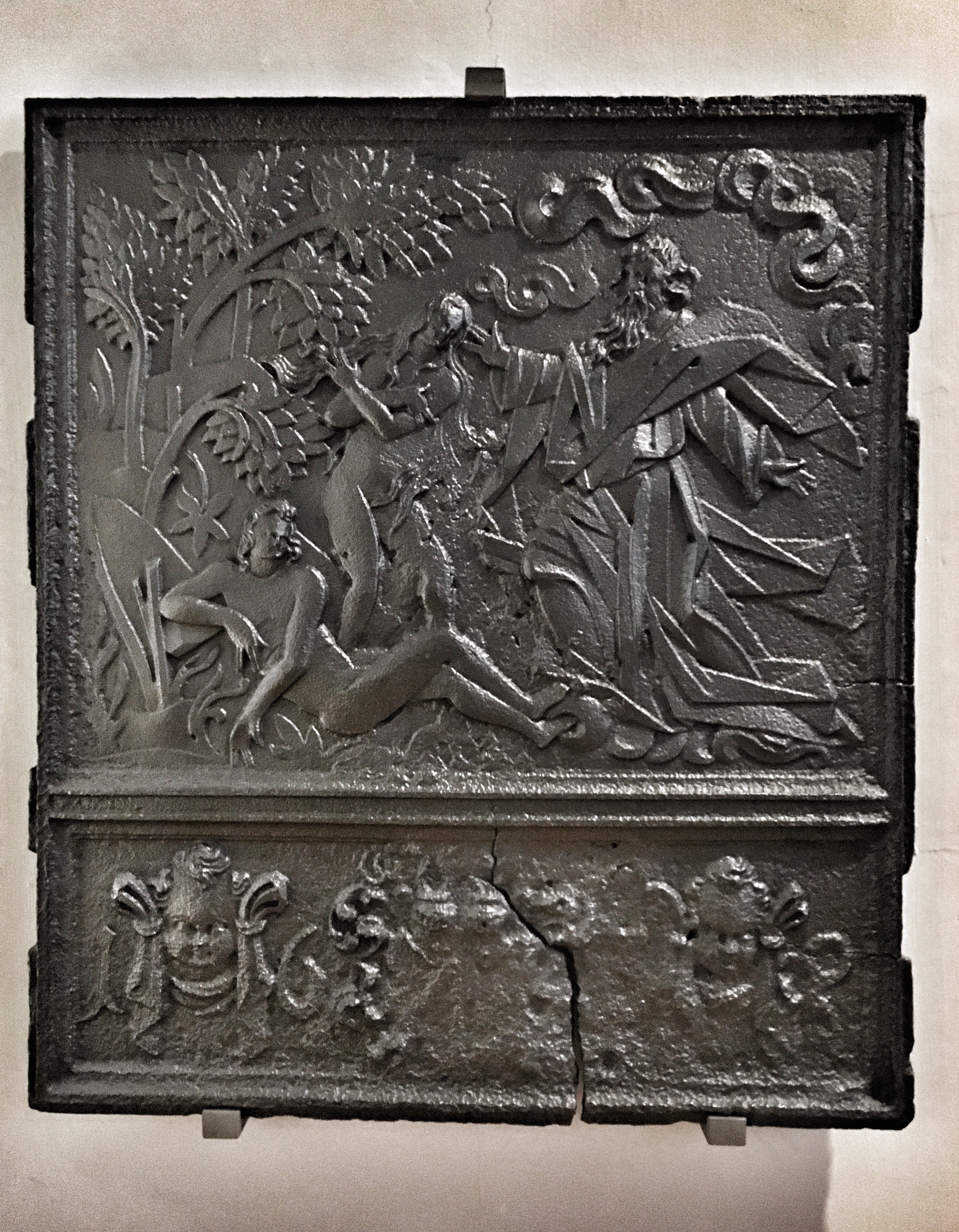
Furnace plate from Fossum Ironworks with Ove Gjedde and his wife's coat of arms

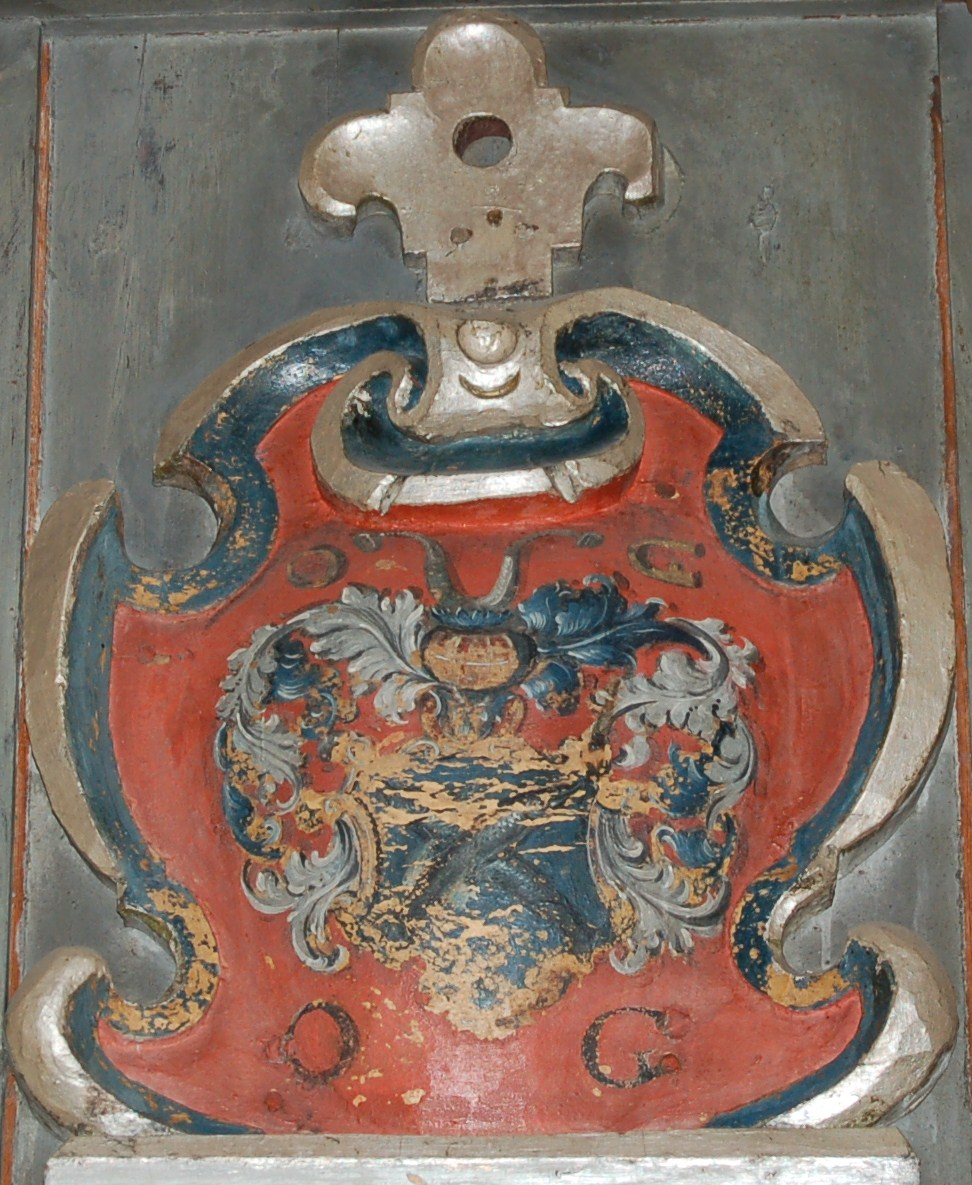
Ove Gjedde's arms at Tjølling Church

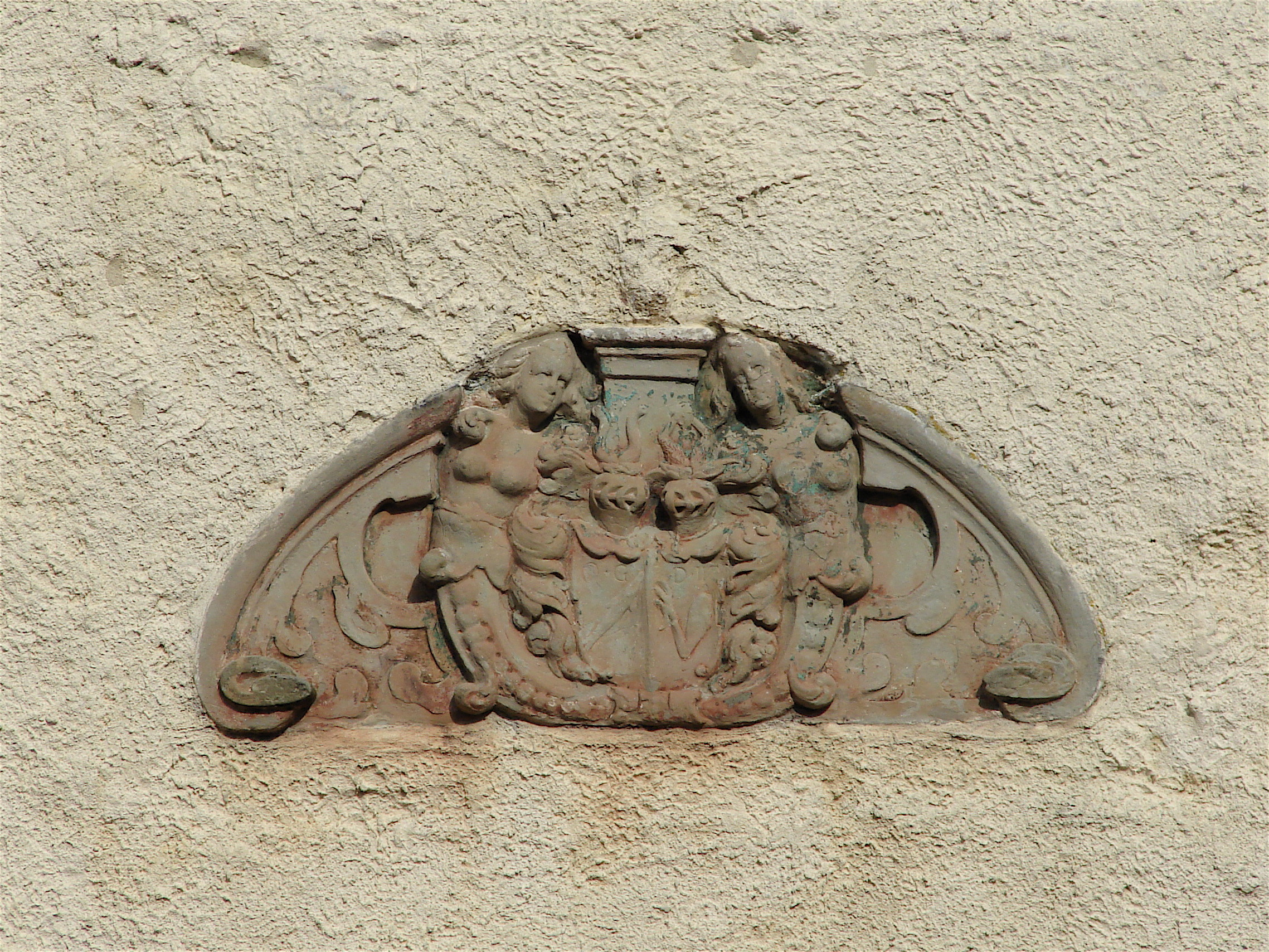
Ove Gjedde and Dorthe Knudsdatter Urne's arms of alliance at Tomarps Kungsgård Castle

== Works cited ==
- Berg, Lorens (1909). Historisk tidsskrift (in Danish). P.T. Mallings bogtrykkeri. p. 184.
- Berg, Lorens (1915). Tjøller, en bygdebok [Tjøller, a village book] (in Norwegian). University of Wisconsin. p. 223.
- Bredsdorff, Asta (2009). The Trials and Travels of Willem Leyel. Copenhagen: Museum Tusculanum Press. ISBN 9788763530231.
- Bricka, Carl Frederik (1885). Kong Christian den fjerdes egenhaendige Breve [King Christian the Fourth's own handwritten letters] (in Danish). Rudolph Klein. p. 72.
- Brock, Peter (1884). De danske Kongers kronologiske samling [Chronological collection of the Danish Kings] (in Danish). Leuven: da:Forlagsbureauet. p. 80.
- Helland, Amund (1885). Norges Land og Folk, statistik og topografisk beskrevet (in Norwegian). H. Aschehoug & Company. p. 214.
- Horn, H.T. (1915). Aarsberetning (in Norwegian). Oslo: Werner & comp. p. 73.
- Lauring, Kåre (11 April 2014). Slaverne dansede og holdt sig lystige: En fortælling om den danske slavehandel (in Danish). Gyldendal A/S. ISBN 978-87-02-15761-1.
- Lauring, Kåre (2017). "Marchells Michielsz Boschouver — imperlebygger eller svindler". M/S Museet for Søfarts årbog (in Danish). 47: 71–114.
- Nordin, Jonas (2016). "The world in a nutshell: a historical archaeology of early modern entanglement in Scandinavia and India studied through the life course of the Danish nobleman Ove Gjedde, 1594–1660". Post-Medieval Archaeology. 50 (2). International Journal of Historical Archaeology: 244–263. doi:10.1080/00794236.2016.1216695.
- Nordin, Jonas Monié (14 May 2020). The Scandinavian Early Modern World. Taylor & Francis. ISBN 978-1-000-06259-5.
- Qvisling, Jon Lauritz [in Norwegian] (1904). Gjerpens prestegjelds og presters historie (in Norwegian). University of Wisconsin: Erik St. Nilssens Forlag. p. 104.
- Rindom, Jan (1995). Ostindisk Kompagni 1616-50 [East Indian Company 1616-50] (PDF) (in Danish). Copenhagen: Det Kongelige Bibliotek.
- Sørensen, Hans Ejnar (2019). Rømøs Historie [History of Rømø] (in Danish). Lindhardt & Ringhof. ISBN 978-87-26-18998-8.
- Stow, Randolph (1979). Denmark in the Indian Ocean, 1616-1845 An Introduction. University of Wollongong Research Online.
- Sturzenbecher, Oscar Patrick (1863). Over Sundet: smaa Bidrag til nærmere bekjendtskab med Sverigs Historie, Naturforhold og Cultur (in Danish). TH. Michaelsen & Tillges Forlag. p. 195.
- Sundt, Eilert Lund (1866). Folkevennen (in Danish). P.T. Malling. p. 69.
- Tuxen, Johan Cornelius (1875). Den danske og norske sømagt [The Danish and Norwegian maritime power] (in Danish). University of Minnesota: Philipsen.
