= Action of 19 February 1619 =

Naval engagement between Danish ships and French privateers

Action of 19 February
- Part of Ove Gjedde's expedition
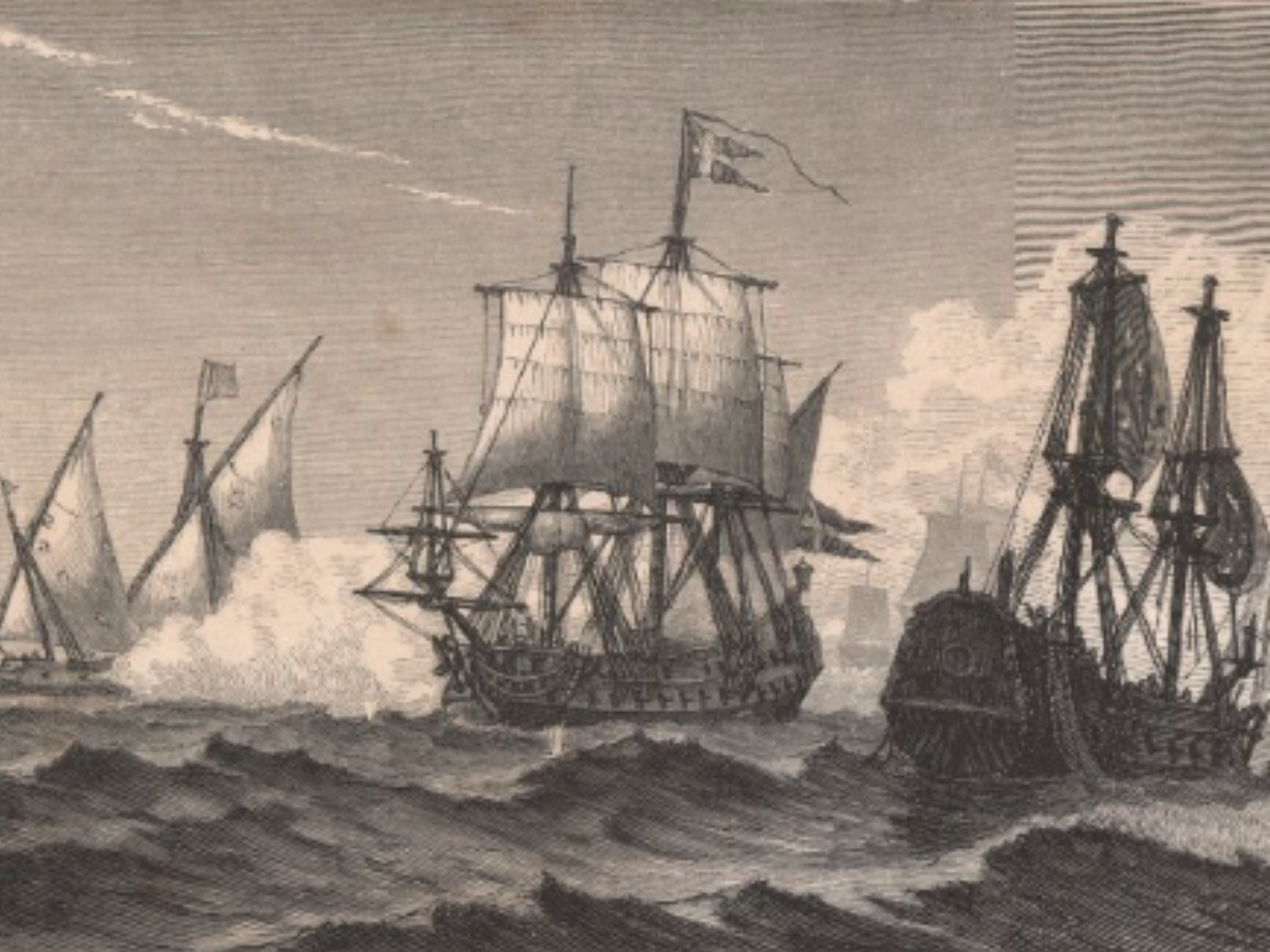
- Ove Gjedde captures two French privateers off Cape Verde, by an unknown author
Date	19 February 1619
Location	Off Cape Verde, Portuguese Empire (present-day Republic of Cabo Verde) 15°04′N 23°38′W
Result	Danish victory

Belligerents
Denmark-Norway; (Danish India) East India	French pirates France

Commanders and leaders
(Denmark–Norway) Ove Gjedde	Unknown

Units involved
(Denmark–Norway) HDMS Elephanten	Lion d'or Jageren

Strength
4 ships	3 ships

Casualties and losses
Unknown	2 ships hijacked 1 ship burned

The Action of 19 February 1619 was a naval engagement between Denmark-Norway, under the leadership of Ove Gjedde, and French privateers, which took place on 19 February 1619, during the first Danish expedition to India. Two French vessels were taken and incorporated into the Royal Danish Navy.

== Dano-French tensions ==
In 1615 a French ship under Abraham du Quesne, was hijacked by the Danish-Norwegian navy and sent to Copenhagen. The French, who had reluctantly tried to get compensation for the ships, now addressed the situation for the French government. The result was that on 9 July 1622, Louis XIII allowed them to hijack and bring Danish vessels to France and arrest all Danish ships, slaves and goods, which came to France.

Christian IV of Denmark-Norway interrupted all Danish contact with France as a response. This conflict continued, with Abraham du Quesne still complaining about the loss of his ship, even though a treaty on the matter of tensions were signed in 1628.

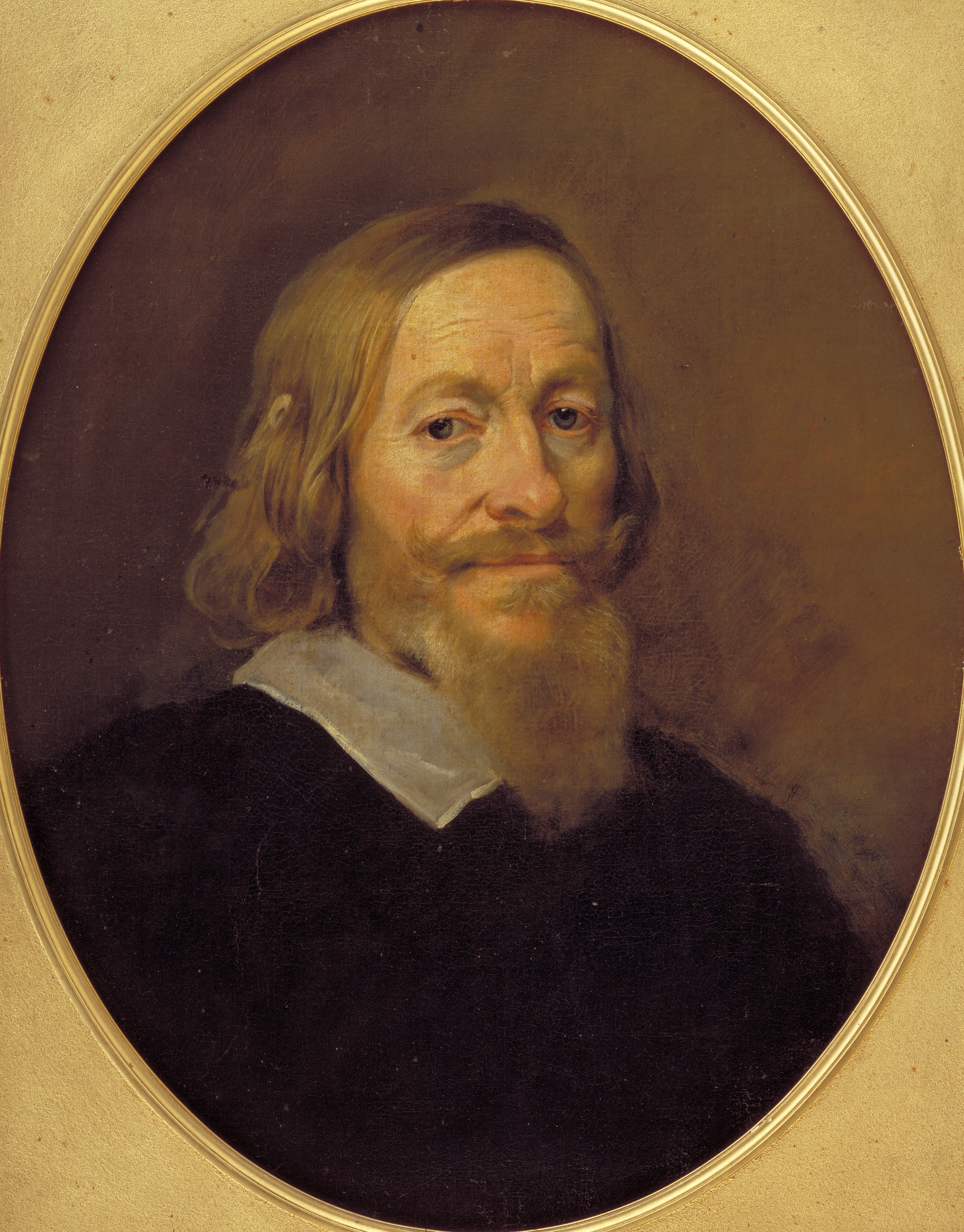
Ove Gjedde, from J.P.Trap's Berømte danske mænd og kvinder (1867)

=== Ove Gjedde's expedition ===
Concurrent with the Dano-French privateer conflict, Denmark-Norway tried to establish itself in the Indian subcontinent, and therefore sent an expeditionary fleet, led by Ove Gjedde to Ceylon. In October 1618 he left Copenhagen, and with 5 vessels and 300 men he set out for Asia to establish a post for the Danish East India Company. because of the Dano-French tensions, Ove gjedde could therefore see any French vessel as an enemy. This sort of naval warfare was supported and protected by both the French and Danish governments.

== Action ==
On the 18 February 1619, Ove Gjedde and his expeditionary fleet got Cape Verde in sight. The vessel, Elephanten, together with a Dutch yacht, went ahead and spotted six ships moored in the harbour. When the admiral of Elephanten saw the ships, he demanded that the Dutch yacht was to get closer to land, while he laid anchor at a nearby island with three other Danish ships. The admiral suspected that the ships could be privateers and would therefore try to lure them out of the harbour, which he succeeded in. On the morning the following day, three of the ships went out of the harbour. Ove Gjedde quickly demanded that Elephanten to chase the three ships, which turned out to be French. The French vessels, the largest being Lion d'or, were on their way to Guinea and Brazil.

Elephanten accompanied by two other ships, went for a short battle with two of the three French ships. After a short battle both ships were hijacked and incorporated into the Danish-Norwegian navy. The third ship went ashore and was burned.

=== Aftermath ===
The three other ships moored to the harbour of Cape Verde were presumably also privateers, since they, in all silence the following night, left the harbour. The crew of the French ships were divided into the Danish vessels, and the Ships were renamed Patientia and Jageren respectively which would be used in the further expedition to Tranquebar. The expedition would end in mixed results, yet would establish Danish India.

== See also ==
- Danish India – Former settlements and trading posts of Denmark and Norway on the Indian subcontinent
- Sinking of the Flensborg – Danish East Indiaman
- Christian IV of Denmark – King of Denmark and Norway from 1588 to 1648
- Dano-Dutch War – War between the Dutch and Danish, 1661–1665
- French privateers – French privateers authorized by the French crown
