= Frigate Flensborg =

Danish East Indiaman

History

Denmark-Norway
- Name: Flensborg
- Namesake: Flensburg (Flensborg)
- Operator: Danish East India Company
- Launched: 1625
- Home port: Copenhagen
- Fate: Blown up off the Cape of Good Hope

General characteristics
- Type: Frigate
- Decks: 1/2
- Crew: + 84

The frigate and man-of-war Flensborg, or Flensburg, was a Danish East Indiaman sent on 2 December 1629 to Tranquebar as the third cargo to India. However, it was blown up by the Portuguese off the Cape of Good Hope in 1630.

== History ==
Flensburg was launched in 1625 and commanded by Thimand Clausen. In the following year, after being loaned out to the Danish East India Company, she went on a voyage to Ireland with spare parts to the Perlen, one of the company's East Indiamen, which was nearly wrecked on its home voyage to Denmark.

In 1629, Christian IV of Denmark concluded peace with Ferdinand II, which meant he could thus regain his interests for the Indian trade. Subsequently, the Flensburg was sent to Tranquebar together with Falken and Fortuna. She was under the command of captain Six Jacobsen. However, upon reaching the Cape of Good Hope, the Flensborg was attacked by Portuguese vessels, which resulted in it catching fire and exploding. Most of the crew was killed in the explosion, and the rest were imprisoned by the Portuguese.

The Fortuna reached Tranquebar on 29 September 1631.

== Sinking ==
Sinking of the Flensborg
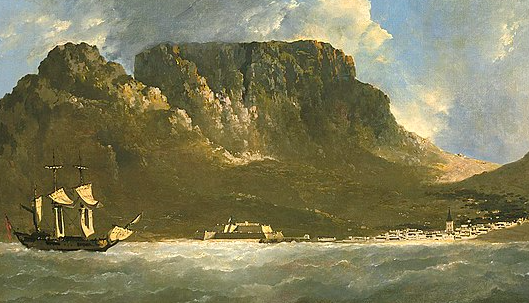
- A View of the Cape of Good Hope, by William Hodges
Date	2 December 1629
Location	Off the Cape of Good Hope, Portuguese Empire (Present-day South Africa) 34°55′31″S 18°25′26″E
Result	Portuguese victory

Belligerents
(Danish India) East India Company	Portuguese Empire

Commanders and leaders
(Danish India) Thimand Clausen (Danish India) Six Jacobsen	(Portuguese Empire) Unknown

Units involved
(Denmark–Norway) Flensborg (Denmark–Norway) Falken	Unknown

Strength
1 ship 1 sloop	Multiple ships

Casualties and losses
1 ship sunk Most men killed 42 imprisoned	Unknown

The Sinking of the Flensborg (Danish: Flensborgs forlis), was a minor skirmish between Danish and Portuguese vessels in 1630 off the Portuguese-controlled Cape of Good Hope. The skirmish resulted in the sinking of the Danish man-of-war Flensborg and caused great financial concerns about the Danish project in India.

=== Background ===
In 1616 the Danish East India Company was established, and in 1620 it acquired the fishing village of Tharangambadi (Tranquebar). The first European cargo arrived in 1623, and another was sent in 1624. However, in 1625 Christian IV of Denmark invaded the Holy Roman Empire, which meant a stop in dispatching ships to India. When peace was concluded in 1629, Christian regained his interests in the Indian affairs and sent two ships, the man-of-war Flesnborg, and a two-mastered sloop, to India in late 1629. They were shortly after followed by the two-mastered vessel, Fortuna.

=== Action ===
When reaching the good hope, the Flensborg came into a fight with the Portuguese. The Portuguese were trying to maintain their monopoly of trade with India, which they claimed had been given to them by the Pope. In the initial skirmish between the Flensborg. and multiple Portuguese ships, the Flensborg was caught on fire and exploded. Most of the men on board the ship were killed in the explosion, and the men who survived were taken as hostages by the Portuguese.

According to other sources, the incident with Flensborg happened off the Malabar Coast, however, this has been rejected.

=== Aftermath and effects ===
When the news of the disaster of the Flensborg reached Copenhagen, it led to speculations as to whether King Christian and the company would be able to invest more capital in the East Indian Trade. Some of the investors claimed it would be best to abandon the whole project, sell the Danish colonies, and bring the Danes home, others maintained that they should wait and see.

== See also ==
- Katten (Danish ship)
- Danish India – Former settlements and trading posts of Denmark and Norway on the Indian subcontinent
- History of the Danish navy
- Action of 19 February 1619 – Naval engagement between Danish ships and French privateers
- Roland Crappé's raids on Portuguese colonies – Danish raids in India and Sri Lanka, 1619
- Conquest of Koneswaram Temple – Destruction and desecration of Koneswaram Temple
- Dano-Carical Conflict – 1644–1645 European conflict in India

== Works cited ==
- Bredsdorff, Asta (2009). The Trials and Travels of Willem Leyel. Copenhagen: Museum Tusculanum Press. ISBN 978-87-635-3023-1.
- Bredsdorff, Asta (1999). Søhistoriske Skrifter (PDF) (in Danish). Vol. XXI. Copenhagen: Handels- og Søfartsmuseet Kronborg.
- Wellen, Kathryn (2015). The Danish East India Company's War against the Mughal Empire, 1642-1698 (PDF). Royal Netherlands Institute for Southeast Asian and Caribbean Studies.
