= Ambush at Portudal =

1619 ambush of Danes by natives

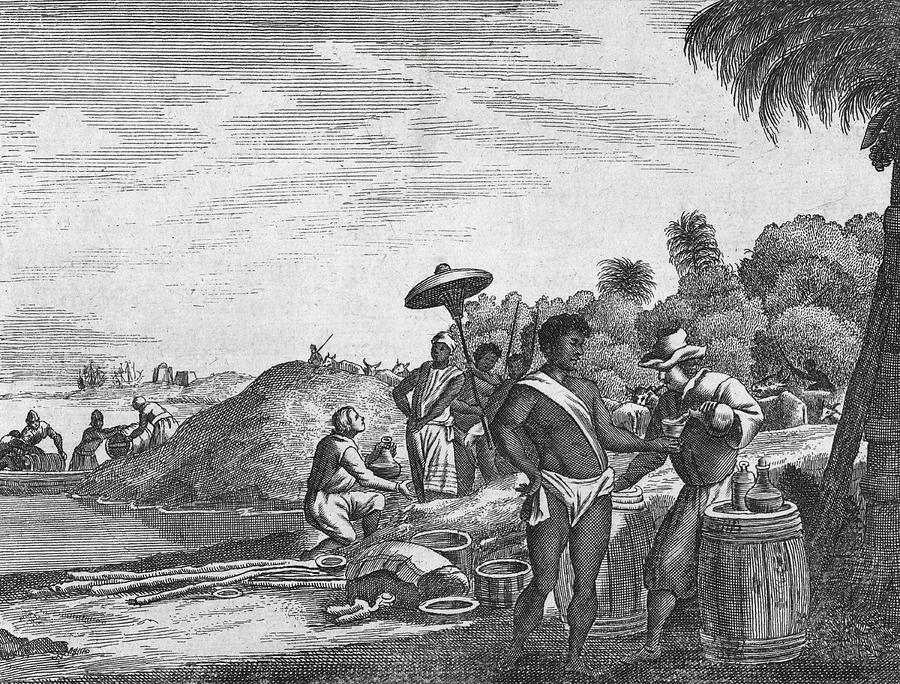
- The king of Cayor negotiating with a European merchant, by Olfert Dapper in 1686
Date	19 March 1619
Location	Portudal (present-day Saly, Senegal) 14°26′18″N 17°0′45″W
Result	Native victory
Territorial changes	Danes retreat from Portudal

Belligerents
Denmark-Norway; Danish India	Natives of Portudal

Commanders and leaders
(Danish India) Ove Gjedde (Danish India) Thyge Stygge	Local king

Units involved
3 troops	Unknown

Strength
50 men	Unknown, presumably large

Casualties and losses
31 casualties	Negligible

The Ambush at Portudal (Danish: Angrebet ved Portudal) was a minor battle fought between natives of Portudal (present-day Saly, Senegal) and Danish armed men on 19 March 1619. The Danes were about to obtain fresh water when they were caught by surprise by local natives. Many of them were either killed, wounded, or captured.

== Background ==
In 1616, the Danish king, Christian IV, established the Danish East India Company as part of his mercantilistic policy to create a trade route between India and Copenhagen. In 1618, the first expedition of the Danish company was initiated with Admiral Ove Gjedde as leader. Gjedde was ordered to establish trading posts to secure the trade traffic and was tasked with finalizing a signed contract with the Raja of Ceylon, Senarath Adahasin.

During the voyage in 1619, the expedition stopped at the coast of Senegal at Portudal (present-day Saly) for fresh provisions and firewood, while mingling with the local natives.

== Ambush ==
On 26 February 1619, an agreement was agreed upon at Portudal, by which the Danish fleet was to obtain wood and water from the natives in exchange for iron bars. However, the natives failed to ratify the bargain and instead threatened the Danes. Consequently, Gjedde took the local native king's envoys as hostages.

On March 11, Gjedde proceeded to land at Portudal with Captain Thyge Stygge, two lieutenants, one ensign, and 50 armed men, to determine whether the place was suitable enough to get the needed provisions without losing men. The Danes found two water sources: one being 100 metres (0.062 mi) away from shore and the other being 1,000 metres (0.62 mi) away. Gjedde found the nearest place more convenient and safer and ordered water to be obtained from there, despite it being a bit brackish.

However, all the officers and men demanded to acquire water from the other water source, deeming it better to drink despite being at risk of native attacks. Gjedde eventually granted their request and stated to them that they would all be killed if the inhabitants made any attempt against them. Notwithstanding this, Gjedde went with them and divided them into three troops between the beach and the water source, with one officer for each troop. But when Gjedde and Thyge Stygge left for the fleet again, the officer of the middle troop went to the shore to bathe, allowing his soldiers to do the same. This left only a small group at their arms, when the natives attacked. As a result, ten Danes were wounded and 31 either killed or taken as prisoners. Eleven of the prisoners were afterwards given back, yet there remained twelve men in captivity.

== Jón Ólafsson's account ==
According to Icelandic Jón Ólafsson's account of the battle, the fleet stopped at Annobón (Note: The island of Annobón lies in the Gulf of Guinea, and Ólafsson wrongly attributes the battle to having taken place here.) to secure fresh meat. Despite heated exchanges with the locals, the Danes managed to get what satisfied them and returned to their boats, sleeping through the night. The next morning, the Danes went ashore again, accompanied by many soldiers for the purpose of obtaining fresh water. Their officers ordered the soldiers to lay aside their weapons to engage in their task, which they subsequently did despite their unwillingness. Suddenly, the natives attacked on three sides with bows, swords, and spears. The Danes could only retreat via sea, but their ship lay moored somewhat far out, and as a result, 13 were killed and many were wounded.

Ólafsson furthermore narrates that one man named Jens Piper had 18 arrows stuck in him when he was rescued. Piper had been pursued by two natives out in the sea, with the intention of drowning him. However, due to his ability to swim, he was eventually rescued. The morning after, the Danes went ashore again to take vengeance on the natives. Yet the natives had left, and the Danes returned to their ship and sailed away the next day.

Ólafsson's account of the engagement is obtained at second-hand and written afterwards from memory. The account does not fully align with Gjedde's account and is somewhat confusing, according to Richard Temple.

== Aftermath ==
A few days later, Gjedde, together with other officers, tried to row ashore again in large boats. They possibly wanted to negotiate the release of Danish prisoners or avenge the inflicted injury and torture by military force. Nonetheless, due to the intense firewood collected, the boats encountered difficulties at sea and only narrowly managed to return to the main fleet.

== Works cited ==
- Tuxen, Johan Cornelius (1875). Den danske op norske sømagt [The Danish and Norwegian maritime power] (in Danish). University of Minnesota: Philipsen.
- Blöndal, Sigfús (2010). The Life of the Icelander Jón Ólafsson, Traveller to India. University of Texas: Taylor & Francis.
