= Dano-Carical Conflict =

1644–1645 European conflict in India

Dano-Karaikal Conflict
- Part of Thirty Years' War outside Europe
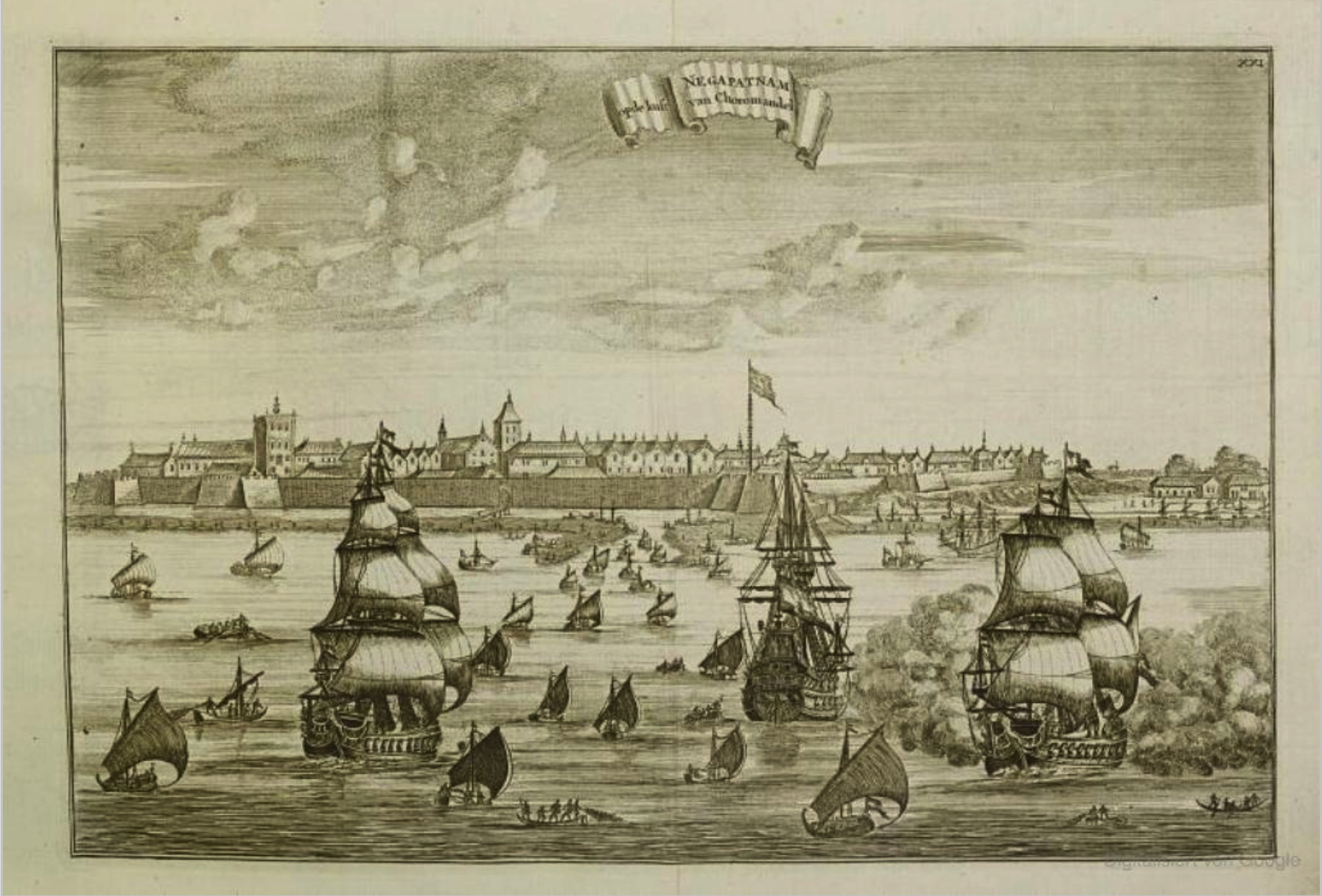
- Dutch boats in the nearby Negapatnam, by Jan Kip
Date	October 1644 – February 1645
Location	Carical, Portuguese India (present-day Karaikal, India) 10.932701°N 79.831853°E
Result	Portuguese-Dutch victory

Belligerents
Danish India	(Portuguese Empire) Portuguese India (Dutch East India Company) Dutch India

Commanders and leaders
(Danish India) Anders Nielsen (Danish India) Simon Jansen (POW)	(Portuguese Empire) Unknown adigar

Units involved
(Danish India) Valby	(Dutch East India Company) Lis

Strength
6 soldiers 4 ships 1 sampan	(Portuguese Empire) 3 ships (Portuguese Empire) 3 sampans (Dutch East India Company) 2 ships

Casualties and losses
1 dead 2 wounded 1 sampan	Many; 1 sampan

The Dano-Carical Conflict (Note: Alternative names include: Dano-Carical War, Dano-Karaikal Conflict, Dano-Karaikal War, Danish-Carical War, Danish-Karaikal War, Danish-Carical Conflict, and the Danish-Karaikal Conflict.) (Danish: Konflikten mod Carical) was a small-scale conflict between the Danes at Tranquebar and the Portuguese at Carical (Karaikal). The conflict includes three smaller naval engagements, which eventually led to a four-hour-long imprisonment of Danish Captain Simon Jansen.

== Prelude ==
In 1643, the Danes, who had been in possession of Tranquebar since 1620, seized a sampan from the Portuguese at Carical (Karaikal). This resulted in the Portuguese wanting to restore the military balance, and this would lead to three hostile incidents between Tranquebar and Carical.

== Conflict ==
In October 1644, the Governor of Danish India, Willem Leyel, received a letter from the commander of Fort Dansborg, Anders Nielsen about a Portuguese seizure of a Danish sampan.

=== First incident ===
According to Nielsen, the sampan, which belonged to a citizen of Tranquebar, was on its way home from Ceylon, when it was attacked by three Portuguese vessels off Carical. The Portuguese carried the sampan with them and the owner of the sampan complained to Nielsen.

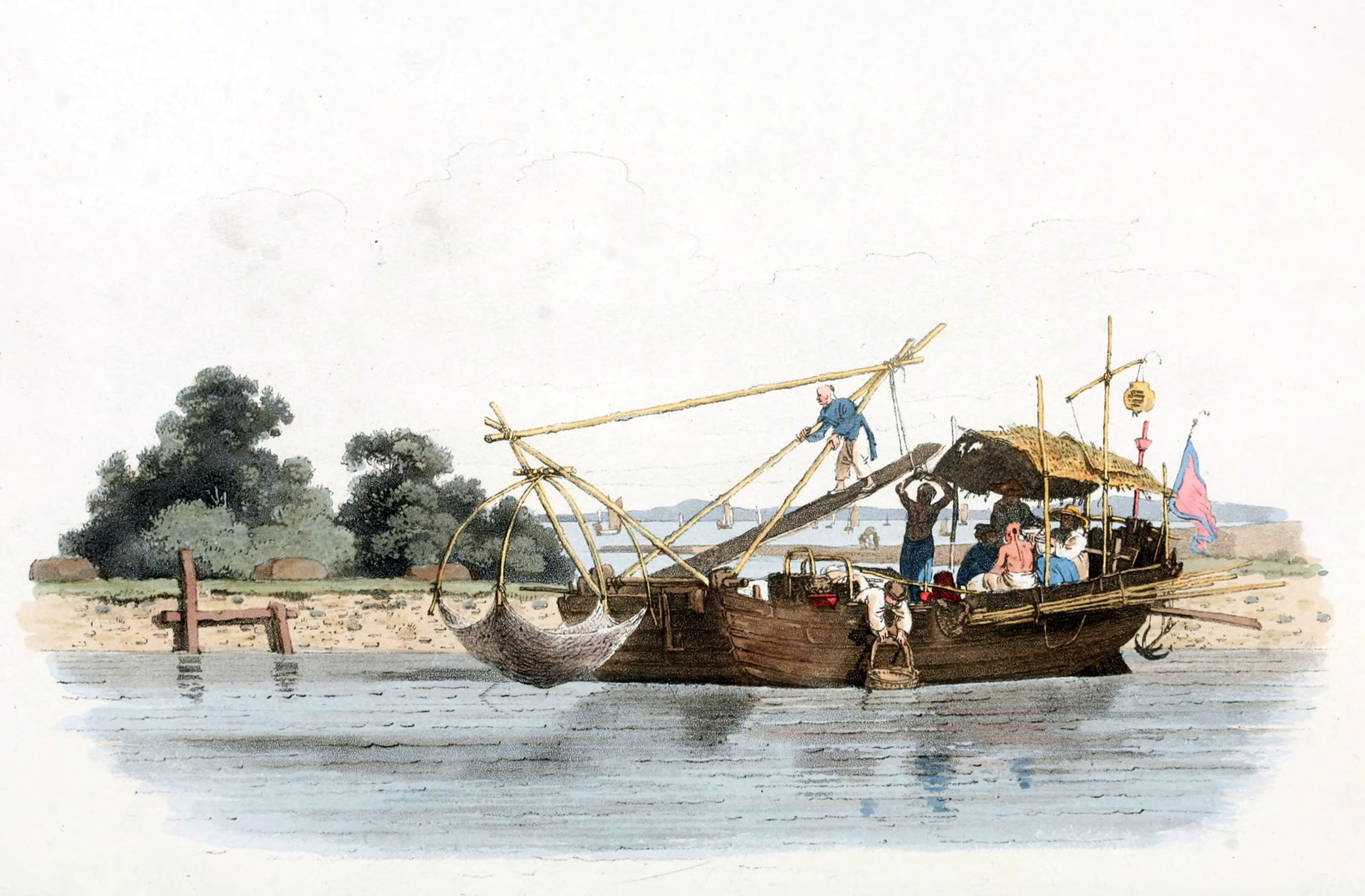
A typical Chinese sampan near the Poyang Lake, by William Alexander in c. 1800.

=== Second incident ===
Despite having no Danish vessels to pursue the Portuguese, Nielsen set off to Carical in an Indian vessel with three white and three Indian soldiers. However, the same three ships that had seized the sampan now appeared again and launched fire upon Nielsen's vessel, where he had to retreat.

Nielsen then wrote a letter to the Carical authorities, threatening to get revenge when he could. In response, the adrigar (a town clerk) responded that they just wanted to restore the balance from the Danish seizure of a Portuguese sampan the year before. However, Neilsen refuted this claim as pure nonsense.

=== Third incident ===
In February 1645, the Valby arrived at Tranquebar, and it, together with Simon Jansen, was sent to Carical to revenge the previous attacks. Jansen seized two sampans lying in the roads, however, two Dutch ships lay at anchor there. The Dutch crews boarded the Valby and Simon Jansen was brought to Carical as a prisoner.

== Aftermath ==
Jansen would stay as a prisoner for roughly four hours until the sampans he had seized got to safety. No further hostilities would occur between the two towns, however, it was known that Carical had supported the Indian general, Tiagepule in his war on Tranquebar.

== See also ==
- Conquest of Koneswaram Temple – Destruction and desecration of Koneswaram Temple
- Sinking of the Flensborg – Danish East Indiaman
- Sieges of Tranquebar (1655–1669) – Warfare in South India from 1655 to 1669
- Roland Crappé's raids on Portuguese colonies – Danish raids in India and Sri Lanka, 1619

== Works cited ==
- Bredsdorff, Asta (2009). The Trials and Travels of Willem Leyel. Copenhagen: Museum Tusculanum Press. ISBN 9788763530231.
- Bredsdorff, Asta (1999). Søhistoriske Skrifter (PDF) (in Danish). Vol. XXI. Copenhagen: Handels- og Søfartsmuseet Kronborg.
- Leyel, Willem (1644). Rentekammerafdelingen: Willum Leyels arkiv (1639 - 1648) (in Danish). Danske Kancelli.
