= Tomarps Kungsgård Castle =

Castle in Scania, Sweden

- Tomarps kungsgård
- Åstorp Municipality
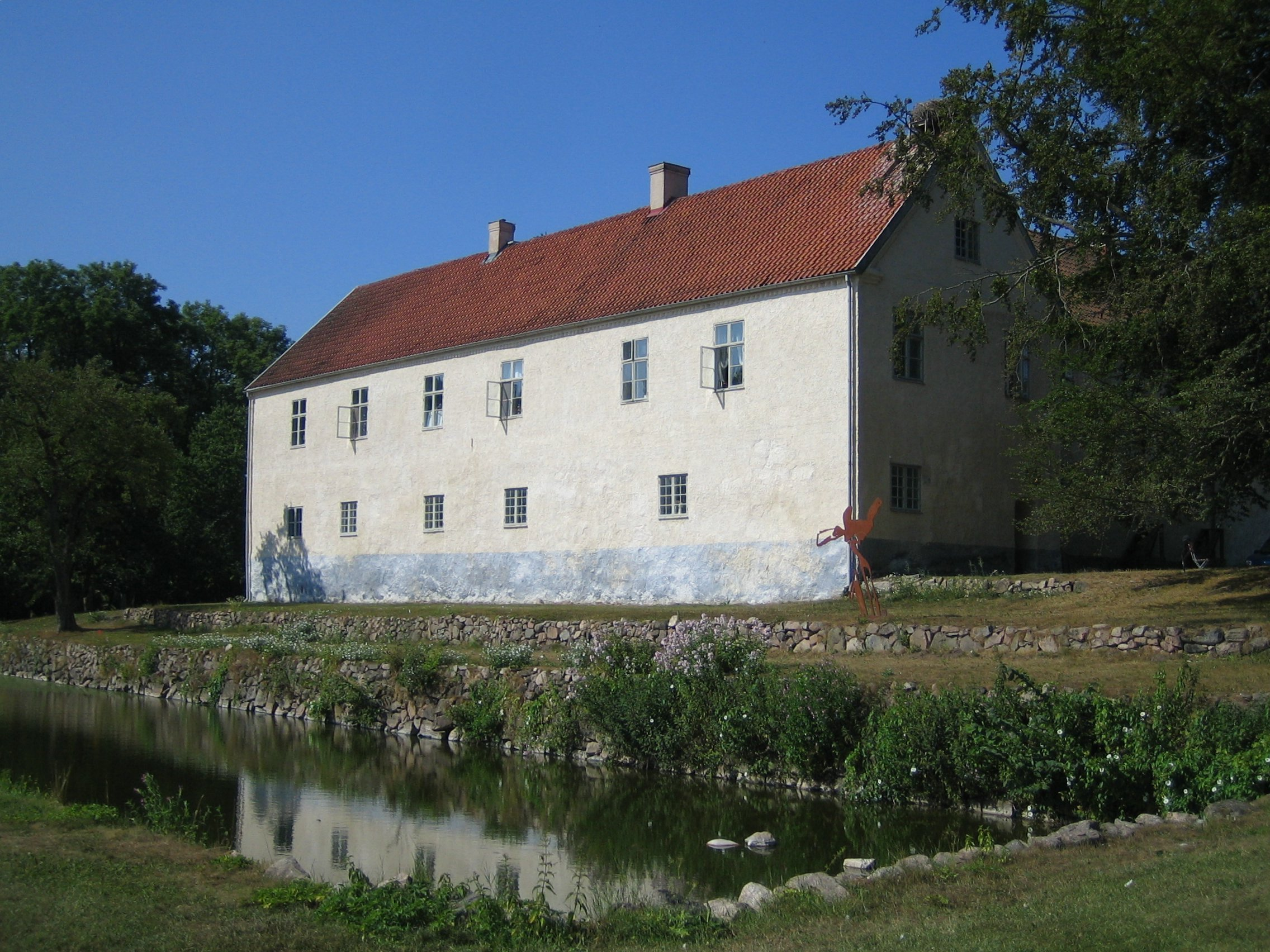
- Tomarps Kungsgård Castle

Site information
- Type: Castle
- Owner: Statens fastighetsverk
- Open to the public: Yes

Location
- Scania, Sweden
- Location within Skåne
- Coordinates: 56.1492°N 13.0614°E

Site history
- Built: 1500s

Tomarps Kungsgård Castle (Swedish: Tomarps kungsgård) is a castle in Åstorp Municipality, Scania in southern Sweden. Probably erected as a Renaissance building in the mid-16th century, composed of 4 two-story-high wings with brick roof surrounded by a narrow (7-meter × 9-meter) rectangular yard. The central part of the north wing contains the remains of a building from the Middle Ages. In the south-east corner of the yard there was a tower until the late 18th century. The castle belonged to the Brosterups lineage in the late 15th century and was subsequently transferred to the Gjedde family. When Bornholm was handed over from Sweden to Denmark according to the Treaty of Copenhagen in 1660 the Castle was, together with 17 other acreages, handed over to the Swedish king as compensation. It was then used for housing by the lieutenant colonel and later the colonel of the Skånska husarregementet. Today it is used for art shows; the shows were planned to stop after the 2013 season.
