= List of island cities and municipalities in the Philippines =

This is a list of cities and municipalities in the Philippines that are located on islands with no land borders with other local government units.

== Luzon ==
- Agutaya
- Anda, Pangasinan (Cabarruyan Island)
- Balabac, Palawan (Balabac and Bugsuk Islands)
- Banton, Romblon
- Cagayancillo
- Calayan, Cagayan (Babuyan Islands)
- Concepcion, Romblon (Maestre de Campo Island)
- Corcuera, Romblon (Simara Island)
- Culion
- Itbayat, Batanes
- Jomalig, Quezon
- Kalayaan, Palawan
- Linapacan
- Patnanungan, Quezon
- Rapu-rapu, Albay (Rapu-rapu and Batan Island)
- Romblon, Romblon
- Sabtang, Batanes
- San Jose, Romblon (Carabao Island)
- Tingloy, Batangas (Maricaban Island)

== Visayas ==
- Almagro, Samar
- Biri, Northern Samar
- Caluya, Antique
- Capul, Northern Samar
- Cordova, Cebu (Cordoba Island and Olango Islands)
- Daram, Samar
- Lapu-Lapu, Cebu (Mactan Island and Olango Islands)
- Limasawa, Southern Leyte
- Maripipi
- Pilar, Cebu (Ponson Island)
- President Carlos P. Garcia, Bohol (Lapinig Island)
- San Antonio, Northern Samar (Dalupiri Island)
- San Francisco, Cebu (Pacijan and Tulang Island)
- San Vicente, Northern Samar (Naranjo Islands)
- Santo Niño, Samar
- Tagapul-an, Samar
- Zumarraga, Samar

== Mindanao ==
- Banguingui, Sulu (Tongkil Islands)
- Hadji Panglima Tahil, Sulu (Marungas Islands)
- Lugus, Sulu
- Mapun, Tawi-Tawi (Cagayan de Sulu Island)
- Pandami, Sulu (Lapac Island)
- Pangutaran, Sulu
- Pata, Sulu
- Samal, Davao del Norte
- Sapa-Sapa, Tawi-Tawi
- Sarangani, Davao del Sur (Sarangani and Balut Islands)
- Siasi, Sulu
- Sibutu, Tawi-Tawi
- Simunul, Tawi-Tawi
- Sitangkai, Tawi-Tawi
- Socorro, Surigao del Norte (Bucas Grande Island)
- South Ubian, Tawi-Tawi
- Tapul, Sulu
- Turtle Islands, Tawi-Tawi

== See also ==
- List of islands in the Philippines
