= Abdulmunir Arbison =

Filipino politician

- اَبْدُلْمُنِرْ مُنْدُكْ اَرْبِسُنْ
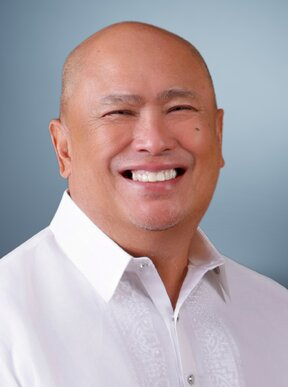
- Official portrait, 2025

Member of the Philippine House of Representatives from Sulu's 2nd district
- Incumbent
- Assumed office June 30, 2025
- Preceded by: Munir N. Arbison Jr.
- In office June 30, 2016 – June 30, 2022
- Preceded by: Maryam Arbison
- Succeeded by: Munir N. Arbison Jr.
- In office June 30, 2001 – June 30, 2010
- Preceded by: Asani Tammang
- Succeeded by: Nur-Ana Sahidulla

Personal details
- Born: Abdulmunir Mundoc Arbison Sr. November 12, 1957 (age 68) Luuk, Sulu, Philippines
- Citizenship: Filipino
- Party: Lakas (2001–2009; 2024–present)
- Other political affiliations: Nacionalista (2016–2024); Liberal (2015–2016); NPC (2009–2015); LDP (2001)
- Education: Manuel L. Quezon University (BS)

Abdulmunir "Munir" Mundoc Arbison Sr. (born November 12, 1957) is a Filipino politician who served as the Representative of Sulu's 2nd district since 2025, a position he previously held from 2016 to 2022 and from 2001 to 2010. He was generally supportive of Philippine and U.S. operations against radical Islamic groups such as the Abu Sayyaf Group and of peace efforts to resolve the conflict in Mindanao. His brother is Allayon M. Arbison Jr.

== Background ==
Arbison was born on November 12, 1957, in Luuk to Abdurahman Arbison (Luuk mayor from 1998 to 2007) and Radzma M. Arbison (Luuk councilor and former president of the Association of Barangay Captains). His mother's family, the Mundoc, is a wealthy family in Luuk. He attended camp Andres elementary school, then Notre Dame of Jolo for high school. For college he attended Manuel L. Quezon University and was educated as a Civil Engineer.

He is married to Hadji Maryam Napil Arbision, an entrepreneur who owns a rental car company in Zamboanga. He has 13 children and several grandchildren.

== Political career ==
Arbison started his political career as an ally to the brothers Benjamin and Tupay Loong. He made his way up in the engineering field, working successively as a civil engineer aide (1978–82) and civil engineer (1982–84) for the Ministry of Public Works and Highways in Jolo, during which time he consolidated his political access, influence and resources. He went on to become an assistant provincial engineer (1984–88), provincial engineer (1998–91) and finally district engineer (1991–2001) in Jolo during the term of Governor Tupay Loong.

Arbison grew to wield strong political influence within 10 of the 18 municipalities in Sulu, and at one point was believed to control approximately 34,000 votes focused in the area around Luuk. These votes were considered valuable currency in deciding the election of political posts in Sulu such as congressional representatives, vice governor, and governor. Over time he forged an alliance that ensured the Loong brothers of legislative victory, leading to the 2004 victory of Benjamin Loong as Governor of Sulu. However, in 2007 Arbison was believed to have switched alliances and supported Abdulsakur Tan; thus Benjamin Loong lost the election as governor, and Tupay Loong lost as first district congressman.

Because he had served three consecutive terms already, he became ineligible for the 2010 congressional election and yielded the seat to Nur-Ana Sahidulla. He ran for Governor of Sulu in the 2010 elections, gathering 48,837 votes, but lost to incumbent Sakur Tan.

== Support for Negotiations and Counterterrorist Operations ==
Arbison has been generally supportive of efforts to support peace in Sulu and counter radical Islamic groups such as the Abu Sayyaf Group:

- Arbison (along with his father, then-mayor of Luuk) reportedly was involved in negotiating for the release of three Indonesian sailors abducted from Basilan by pirates and taken to the mountains of Luuk in 2002.
- In mid-2003 he led the drive among town mayors in Sulu Province to support the Balikatan 03-1 U.S.-Filipino joint military training exercises, despite some opposition from his congressional district. In the end, 17 of 18 town mayors supported the initiative.
- In August 2003 he was one of many political leaders who voiced his support for President Gloria Macapagal Arroyo's peace initiatives to end the bloody war with the Moro Islamic Liberation Front (MILF).
- Arbison in February 2004 urged his constituents to continue supporting military operations against the Abu Sayyaf bandits by relaying information on their whereabouts. He vowed to continue his commitment to eliminating the traces of terror in the province so that it would become a good investment location.

== Business interests ==
Arbison owns a shipping business that operates in Sulu and Zamboanga.
