= Nur-Ana Sahidulla =

Filipino politician

- نُرْ اَنَ سَهِدُّلَ
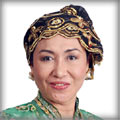
- Official portrait, 2010

Member of the Philippine House of Representatives from Sulu's 2nd district
- In office June 30, 2010 – June 30, 2013
- Preceded by: Abdulmunir Mundoc Arbison
- Succeeded by: Maryam Arbison

Vice Governor of Sulu
- In office June 30, 2004 – June 30, 2010
- Governor: Benjamin Loong (2004–2007); Abdusakur Tan (2007–2010)

Mayor of Banguingui, Sulu
- In office June 30, 1998 – June 30, 2004

Chair of the Philippine Red Cross-Sulu Chapter
- Incumbent
- Assumed office 2004

Personal details
- Born: Nur-Ana Indanan; September 21, 1959 (age 67) Indanan, Sulu, Philippines
- Citizenship: Philippine
- Party: Independent (2024–present)
- Other political affiliations: PDDS (2021–2024); KDP (2018–2021); PDP–Laban (2015–2018); NPC (until 2015)
- Spouse: Abdulwahid O. Sahidulla
- Education: Zamboanga A.E. Colleges (BS); Western Mindanao State University (BA)

Nur-Ana "Lady Ann" Indanan Sahidulla is a Filipino politician. She was a representative of Sulu Province's 2nd congressional district in the Autonomous Region in Muslim Mindanao (ARMM) from 2010 to 2013. She is a close ally of Abdusakur Mahail Tan.

== Personal life ==
"Lady Ann" was born September 21, 1959, in Pasil, Indanan, as the daughter of Sitti Rashidam Indanan and Omar Suhaili. She attended Rio Hondo Elementary School, Southern City Colleges High School in Zamboanga, and then received her Bachelor of Science in Commerce from Zamboanga AE Colleges, now Universidad de Zamboanga in 1980. She also received a Bachelor of Arts in Mass Communication in 1988 from Western Mindanao State University, Zamboanga City.

She is married to Abdulwahid O. Sahdulla, mayor of Banguingui, and is sister to Delna Indanan-Hassan who married ARMM Assemblyman Alhabsi Hassan. She has four children. She is a "professional" song composer and singer with her own band.

== Political career ==
Sahidulla was the mayor of Banguingui Sulu for two consecutive terms from 1998 to 2004 and then went on to serve two terms as vice-governor of Sulu serving from 2004 to 2010. In 2010 she gave up the seat to Benjamin Loong, instead running as the representative from the 2nd District.

Lady Ann has a reputation as an advocate of peace and justice, and as a negotiator. In 1995 she established the Anak Ilo Foundation, and since 2004 has been chairwoman of the Philippine National Red Cross, Sulu Chapter.

In 2008, when she was vice governor, she did negotiations to free her cameramen from the Abu Sayyaf militant group.

In 2019, Lady Ann ran for Senator in the 2019 Philippine Senate election under the Far-right Katipunan ng Demokratikong Pilipino and lost, in 2022, Lady Ann ran for Senator again in the 2022 Philippine Senate elections with the political party Pederalismo ng Dugong Dakilang Samahan (or PDDS) not joining any slate, but she got the 52nd spot with 572,645 votes or 1.03% of the votes. In 2025, Lady Ann once again ran for Senator in the 2025 Philippine Senate elections as an Independent. She ended up getting the 60th spot with 476,855 votes or 0.11% of the votes.
