= Panglima Estino =

Municipality in Sulu, Philippines

Panglima Estino فَڠْلِمَ اِسْتِنُ
- Municipality
- Municipality of Panglima Estino
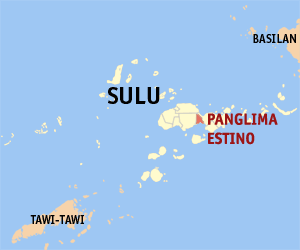
- Map of Sulu with Panglima Estino highlighted
- Interactive map of Panglima Estino
- Location within the Philippines
- Coordinates: 5°58′N 121°12′E
- Country: Philippines
- Region: Zamboanga Peninsula
- Province: Sulu
- District: 2nd district
- Barangays: 12 (see Barangays)

Government
  - Type: Sangguniang Bayan
  - Mayor: Munib S. Estino
  - Vice Mayor: Morsid M. Estino
  - Representative: Munir N. Arbison Jr.
  - Municipal Council: Members: Abdurasul A. Sirajan; Falsidar H. Estino; Hector S. Abubakar; Julamri A. Abdusali; Madjuri A. Husaim; Nuraja S. Jailan; Rashidin I. Estino; Darwin L. Jamil
  - Electorate: 9,979 voters (2025)

Area
  - Total: 125.10 km^{2} (48.30 sq mi)
- Elevation: 38 m (125 ft)
- Highest elevation: 388 m (1,273 ft)
- Lowest elevation: 0 m (0 ft)

Population (2024 census)
  - Total: 37,157
  - Density: 297.02/km^{2} (769.27/sq mi)
  - Households: 4,974

Economy
  - Income class: 3rd municipal income class
  - Poverty incidence: 29.37% (2023)
  - Revenue: ₱ 154.7 million (2022)
  - Assets: ₱ 216.4 million (2022)
  - Expenditure: ₱ 137 million (2022)
  - Liabilities: ₱ 132 million (2022)

Service provider
  - Electricity: Sulu Electric Cooperative (SULECO)
- Time zone: UTC+8 (PST)
- ZIP code: 7415
- PSGC: 1906616000
- IDD : area code: +63 (0)68
- Native languages: Tausug; Tagalog

Panglima Estino, officially the Municipality of Panglima Estino (Tausūg: Kawman sin Panglima Estino; Filipino: Bayan ng Panglima Estino), is a municipality in the province of Sulu, Philippines. According to the 2024 census, it has a population of 37,157 people.

== History ==
On January 1, 1980, then President Ferdinand Marcos enacted Presidential Decree No. 1663 creating the municipality of New Panamao from the mother municipality of Panamao. However to avoid confusion from the mother municipality, on January 2, 1981, then President Marcos enacted Presidential Decree No. 1757 renaming New Panamao to its current name, Panglima Estino.

== Geography ==
=== Barangays ===
Panglima Estino is politically subdivided into 12 barangays. Each barangay consists of puroks while some have sitios.

- Gagguil
- Gata-gata
- Jinggan
- Kamih-Pungud
- Lihbug Kabaw
- Likbah
- Lubuk-lubuk
- Marsada
- Paiksa
- Pandakan
- Punay (Poblacion)
- Tiptipon

=== Climate ===
Climate data for Panglima Estino, Sulu
Month	Jan	Feb	Mar	Apr	May	Jun	Jul	Aug	Sep	Oct	Nov	Dec	Year
Mean daily maximum °C (°F)	27 (81)	27 (81)	27 (81)	28 (82)	28 (82)	28 (82)	28 (82)	28 (82)	28 (82)	28 (82)	28 (82)	28 (82)	28 (82)
Mean daily minimum °C (°F)	27 (81)	26 (79)	27 (81)	27 (81)	28 (82)	28 (82)	27 (81)	27 (81)	28 (82)	28 (82)	27 (81)	27 (81)	27 (81)
Average precipitation mm (inches)	152 (6.0)	120 (4.7)	125 (4.9)	132 (5.2)	239 (9.4)	301 (11.9)	281 (11.1)	268 (10.6)	190 (7.5)	263 (10.4)	234 (9.2)	179 (7.0)	2,484 (97.9)
Average rainy days	17.4	14.9	15.8	15.4	22.7	24.4	25.0	23.5	20.5	22.7	21.2	18.7	242.2
Source: Meteoblue (modeled/calculated data, not measured locally)

== Demographics ==
Population census of Panglima Estino
Year	Pop.	±% p.a.
1980	11,854	—
1990	15,683	+2.84%
1995	18,597	+3.24%
2000	21,443	+3.10%
2007	35,263	+7.10%
2010	27,724	−8.38%
2015	28,817	+0.74%
2020	34,249	+3.70%
2024	37,157	+1.98%
Source: Philippine Statistics Authority

== Economy ==
Poverty Incidence of Panglima Estino

Source: Philippine Statistics Authority
