= Sulu's 2nd congressional district =

Legislative district of the Philippines

- Constituency for the House of Representatives of the Philippines
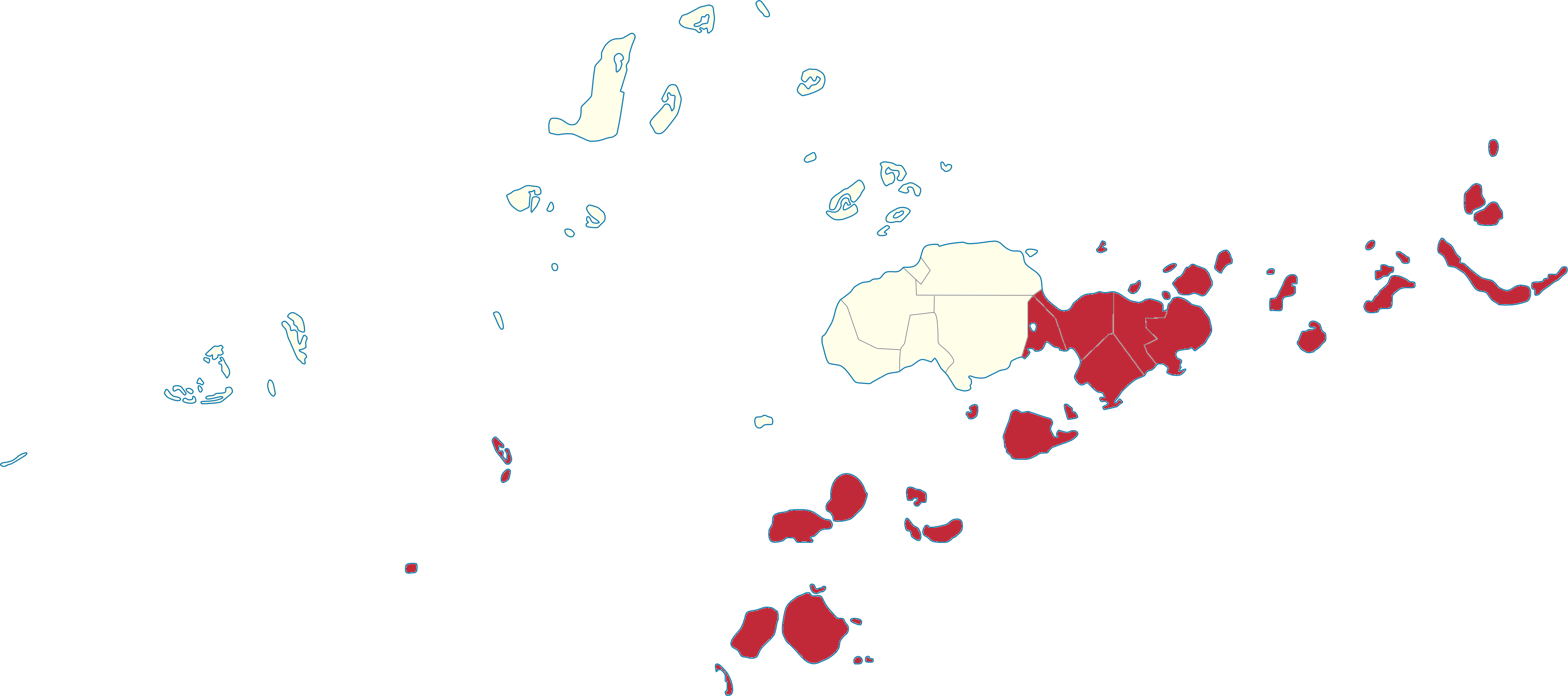
- Boundary of Sulu's 2nd congressional district in Sulu

- Location of Sulu within the Philippines
- Province: Sulu
- Region: Zamboanga Peninsula
- Population: 338,668 (2015)
- Electorate: 186,559 (2022)
- Major settlements: 11 LGUs: Municipalities; Banguingui; Kalingalan Caluang; Lugus; Luuk; Old Panamao; Omar; Pandami; Panglima Estino; Pata; Siasi; Tapul
- Area: 989.17 km^{2} (381.92 sq mi)

Current constituency
- Created: 1987
- Representative: Abdulmunir Arbison
- Political party: Lakas
- Congressional bloc: Majority

Sulu's 2nd congressional district is a congressional district in the province of Sulu. It has been represented in the House of Representatives of the Philippines since 1987. The district encompasses the eastern half of Jolo island, composed of five municipalities, as well as the eastern outlying islands of Tongkil (Banguingui) and the southern outlying islands of Lugus, Pandami, Pata, Siasi and Tapul. It is currently represented in the 20th Congress by Abdulmunir Arbison of the Lakas–CMD.

== Representation history ==
#	Image	Member	Term of office		Congress	Party	Electoral history	Constituent LGUs
#	Image	Member	Start	End	Congress	Party	Electoral history	Constituent LGUs
=== Sulu's 2nd district for the House of Representatives of the Philippines ===
District created February 2, 1987 from Sulu's at-large district.
1		Arden S. Anni	December 3, 1987	June 30, 1992	8th	UNIDO	Elected in 1987.	1987–2001; Kalingalan Caluang, Lugus, Luuk, Old Panamao, Pandami, Panglima Estino, Pata, Siasi, Tapul, Tongkil
2		Asani S. Tammang	June 30, 1992	June 30, 2001	9th	Lakas	Elected in 1992.	1987–2001; Kalingalan Caluang, Lugus, Luuk, Old Panamao, Pandami, Panglima Estino, Pata, Siasi, Tapul, Tongkil
2		Asani S. Tammang	June 30, 1992	June 30, 2001	10th	Lakas	Re-elected in 1995.	1987–2001; Kalingalan Caluang, Lugus, Luuk, Old Panamao, Pandami, Panglima Estino, Pata, Siasi, Tapul, Tongkil
2		Asani S. Tammang	June 30, 1992	June 30, 2001	11th	LAMMP	Re-elected in 1998.	1987–2001; Kalingalan Caluang, Lugus, Luuk, Old Panamao, Pandami, Panglima Estino, Pata, Siasi, Tapul, Tongkil
3		Abdulmunir Arbison	June 30, 2001	June 30, 2010	12th	Lakas	Elected in 2001.	2001–2010; Banguingui, Kalingalan Caluang, Lugus, Luuk, Old Panamao, Pandami, Panglima Estino, Pata, Siasi, Tapul
3		Abdulmunir Arbison	June 30, 2001	June 30, 2010	13th	Lakas	Re-elected in 2004.	2001–2010; Banguingui, Kalingalan Caluang, Lugus, Luuk, Old Panamao, Pandami, Panglima Estino, Pata, Siasi, Tapul
3		Abdulmunir Arbison	June 30, 2001	June 30, 2010	14th	NPC	Re-elected in 2007.	2001–2010; Banguingui, Kalingalan Caluang, Lugus, Luuk, Old Panamao, Pandami, Panglima Estino, Pata, Siasi, Tapul
4		Nur-Ana I. Sahidulla	June 30, 2010	June 30, 2013	15th	NPC	Elected in 2010.	2010–present Banguingui, Kalingalan Caluang, Lugus, Luuk, Old Panamao, Omar, Pandami, Panglima Estino, Pata, Siasi, Tapul
5		Maryam N. Arbison	June 30, 2013	June 30, 2016	16th	Liberal	Elected in 2013.	2010–present Banguingui, Kalingalan Caluang, Lugus, Luuk, Old Panamao, Omar, Pandami, Panglima Estino, Pata, Siasi, Tapul
(3)		Abdulmunir Arbison	June 30, 2016	June 30, 2022	17th	Nacionalista	Elected in 2016.	2010–present Banguingui, Kalingalan Caluang, Lugus, Luuk, Old Panamao, Omar, Pandami, Panglima Estino, Pata, Siasi, Tapul
(3)		Abdulmunir Arbison	June 30, 2016	June 30, 2022	18th	Nacionalista	Re-elected in 2019.	2010–present Banguingui, Kalingalan Caluang, Lugus, Luuk, Old Panamao, Omar, Pandami, Panglima Estino, Pata, Siasi, Tapul
6		Munir Arbison Jr.	June 30, 2022	June 30, 2025	19th	Lakas	Elected in 2022.	2010–present Banguingui, Kalingalan Caluang, Lugus, Luuk, Old Panamao, Omar, Pandami, Panglima Estino, Pata, Siasi, Tapul
(3)		Abdulmunir Arbison	June 30, 2025	Incumbent	20th	Lakas	Elected in 2025.	2010–present Banguingui, Kalingalan Caluang, Lugus, Luuk, Old Panamao, Omar, Pandami, Panglima Estino, Pata, Siasi, Tapul

== Election results ==
=== 2025 ===
Candidate	Party	Votes	%
Abdulmunir Arbison	Lakas–CMD	151,548	100.00
Total		151,548	100.00
Valid votes		151,548	87.83
Invalid/blank votes		20,995	12.17
Total votes		172,543	100.00
Registered voters/turnout		202,026	85.41
Lakas–CMD hold			
Source: Commission on Elections

=== 2022 ===
Candidate	Party	Votes	%
Munir Arbison Jr.	Lakas–CMD	148,262	100.00
Total		148,262	100.00
Total votes		168,584	–
Registered voters/turnout		186,559	90.36
Lakas–CMD gain from Nacionalista Party			
Source: Commission on Elections

== See also ==
- Legislative districts of Sulu
