= Omar, Sulu =

Municipality in Sulu, Philippines

Omar عمر
- Municipality
- Municipality of Omar
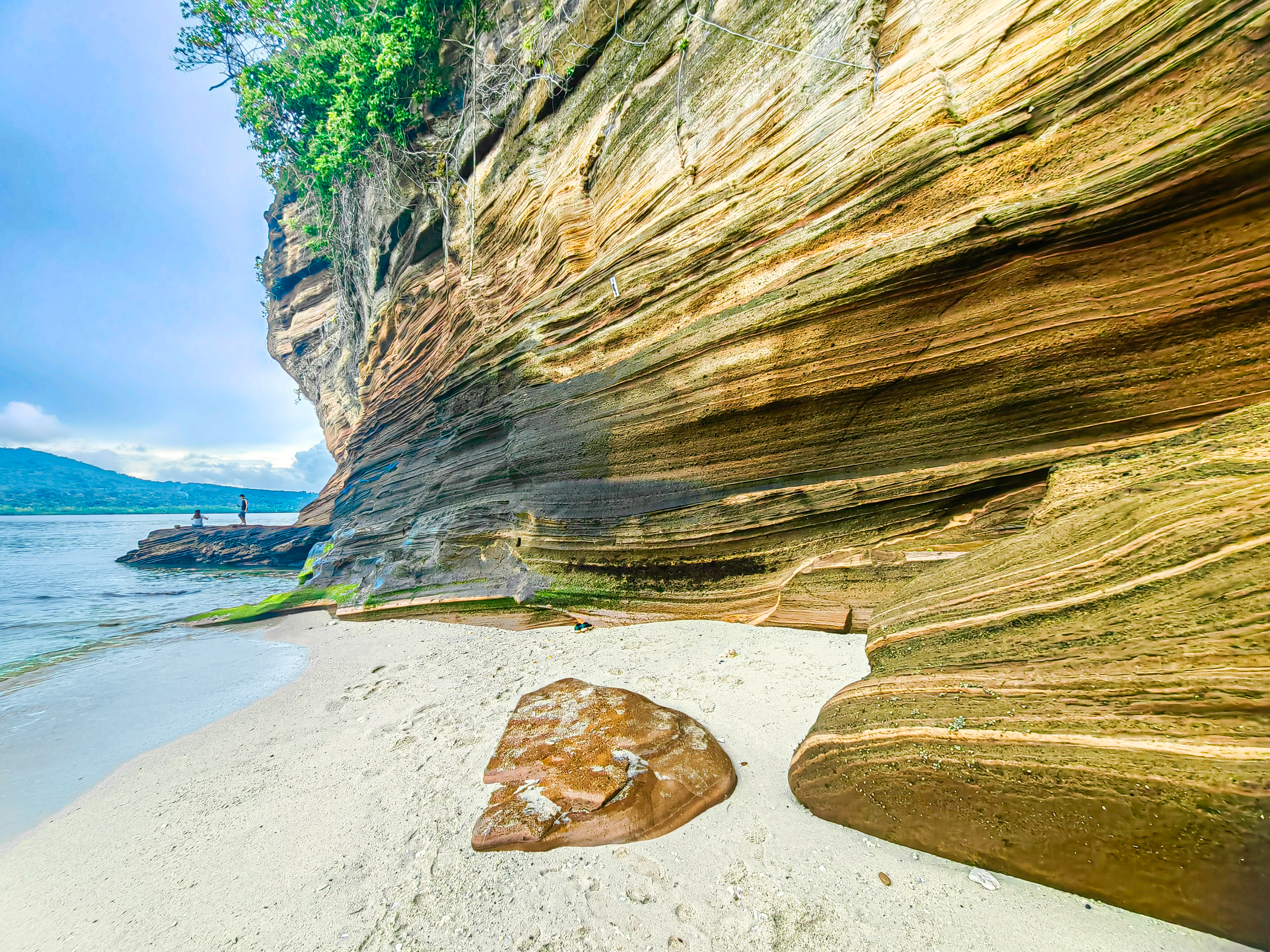
- Tandang Mairan Rock Formation in Capual Island

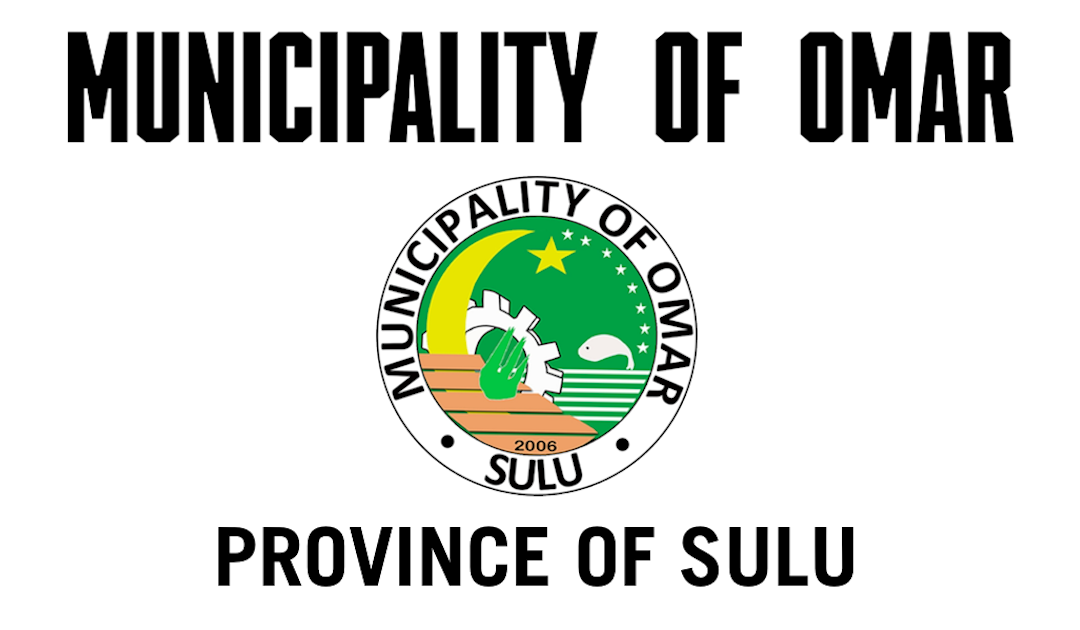
- Flag Seal

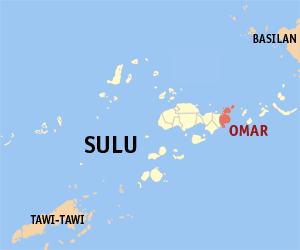
- Map of Sulu with Omar highlighted
- Interactive map of Omar
- Location within the Philippines
- Coordinates: 6°00′33″N 121°23′15″E
- Country: Philippines
- Region: Zamboanga Peninsula
- Province: Sulu
- District: 2nd district
- Founded: December 20, 2005
- Barangays: 8 (see Barangays)

Government
  - Type: Sangguniang Bayan
  - Mayor: Abdulbaki J. Ajibon
  - Vice Mayor: Juddin-Nur A. Pantasan
  - Representative: Munir N. Arbison Jr.
  - Municipal Council: Members: Raja G. Adjak; Hajan I. Aliuddin; Eldisin J. Angsa; Bartazar K. Alimon; Warsa I. Mursin; Basir A. Abdulhamid; Ali S. Alimuddin; Nur Hann I. Omar
  - Electorate: 19,162 voters (2025)

Area
  - Total: 180.98 km^{2} (69.88 sq mi)
- Elevation: 38 m (125 ft)
- Highest elevation: 400 m (1,300 ft)
- Lowest elevation: 0 m (0 ft)

Population (2024 census)
  - Total: 53,903
  - Density: 297.84/km^{2} (771.40/sq mi)
  - Households: 4,877

Economy
  - Income class: 4th municipal income class
  - Poverty incidence: 25.75% (2023)
  - Revenue: ₱ 149.1 million (2022)
  - Assets: ₱ 404.2 million (2022)
  - Expenditure: ₱ 96.27 million (2022)
  - Liabilities: ₱ 161.2 million (2022)

Service provider
  - Electricity: Sulu Electric Cooperative (SULECO)
- Time zone: UTC+8 (PST)
- ZIP code: 7404
- PSGC: 1906619000
- IDD : area code: +63 (0)68
- Native languages: Tausug; Tagalog

Omar, officially the Municipality of Omar (Tausūg: Kawman sin Omar; Tagalog: Bayan ng Omar), is a municipality in the province of Sulu, Philippines. According to the 2024 census, it has a population of 53,903 people.

It was created out of the 8 barangays of Luuk, by virtue of Muslim Mindanao Autonomy Act No. 194, which was subsequently ratified in a plebiscite held on July 18, 2007.

== Geography ==
=== Barangays ===
Omar is politically subdivided into 8 barangays. Each barangay consists of puroks while some have sitios.

- Andalan
- Angilan
- Capual Island
- Huwit-huwit
- Lahing-Lahing
- Niangkaan
- Sucuban
- Tangkuan

=== Climate ===
Climate data for Omar, Sulu
Month	Jan	Feb	Mar	Apr	May	Jun	Jul	Aug	Sep	Oct	Nov	Dec	Year
Mean daily maximum °C (°F)	27 (81)	27 (81)	27 (81)	27 (81)	28 (82)	28 (82)	28 (82)	28 (82)	28 (82)	28 (82)	28 (82)	27 (81)	28 (82)
Mean daily minimum °C (°F)	26 (79)	26 (79)	26 (79)	27 (81)	27 (81)	27 (81)	27 (81)	27 (81)	27 (81)	27 (81)	27 (81)	27 (81)	27 (81)
Average precipitation mm (inches)	152 (6.0)	120 (4.7)	125 (4.9)	132 (5.2)	239 (9.4)	301 (11.9)	281 (11.1)	268 (10.6)	190 (7.5)	263 (10.4)	234 (9.2)	179 (7.0)	2,484 (97.9)
Average rainy days	17.4	14.9	15.8	15.4	22.7	24.4	25.0	23.5	20.5	22.7	21.2	18.7	242.2
Source: Meteoblue (modeled/calculated data, not measured locally)

== Demographics ==
Population census of Omar
Year	Pop.	±% p.a.
2007	25,102	—
2010	18,098	−11.22%
2015	25,116	+6.44%
2020	28,070	+2.37%
2024	53,903	+16.96%
Source: Philippine Statistics Authority

== Economy ==
Poverty Incidence of Omar

Source: Philippine Statistics Authority
