= Kalingalan Caluang =

Municipality in Sulu, Philippines

Kalingalan Caluang كاليڠالن چالوڠ
- Municipality
- Municipality of Kalingalan Caluang
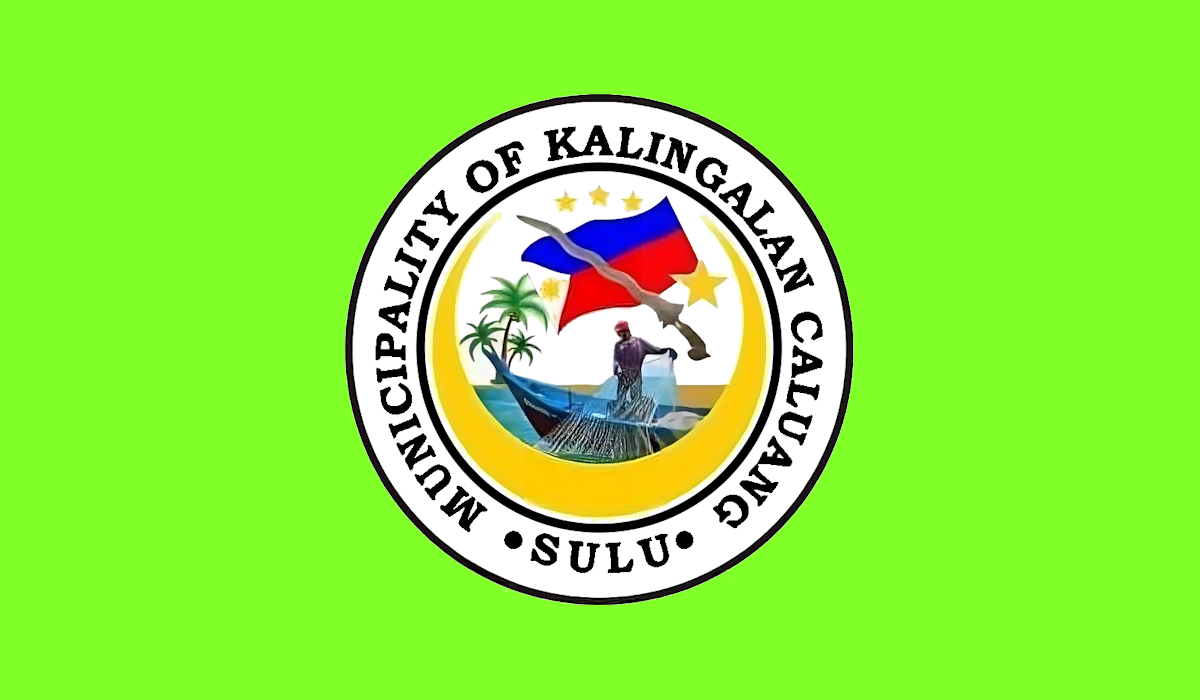
- Flag Seal

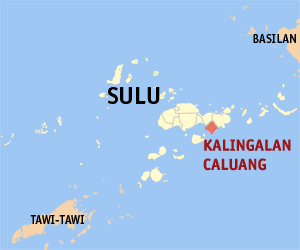
- Map of Sulu with Kalingalan Caluang highlighted
- Interactive map of Kalingalan Caluang
- Location within the Philippines
- Coordinates: 5°53′N 121°16′E
- Country: Philippines
- Region: Zamboanga Peninsula
- Province: Sulu
- District: 2nd district
- Barangays: 9 (see Barangays)

Government
  - Type: Sangguniang Bayan
  - Mayor: Nurshamier A. Halun
  - Vice Mayor: Al-Razhmie A. Halun
  - Representative: Munir N. Arbison Jr.
  - Municipal Council: Members: Sadri S. Imamil; Aldasil B. Adam; Nuryasser A. Imbing; Denrasher H. Susulan; Warid H. Jain; Jamra A. Hassan; Rajabadar M. Mahamod; Tantong J. Jumaidim
  - Electorate: 15,918 voters (2025)

Area
  - Total: 166.50 km^{2} (64.29 sq mi)
- Elevation: 43 m (141 ft)
- Highest elevation: 386 m (1,266 ft)
- Lowest elevation: −2 m (−6.6 ft)

Population (2024 census)
  - Total: 42,845
  - Density: 257.33/km^{2} (666.47/sq mi)
  - Households: 6,912

Economy
  - Income class: 3rd municipal income class
  - Poverty incidence: 17.25% (2023)
  - Revenue: ₱ 170.6 million (2022)
  - Assets: ₱ 344.3 million (2022)
  - Expenditure: ₱ 105.9 million (2022)
  - Liabilities: ₱ 118.6 million (2022)

Service provider
  - Electricity: Sulu Electric Cooperative (SULECO)
- Time zone: UTC+8 (PST)
- ZIP code: 7416
- PSGC: 1906603000
- IDD : area code: +63 (0)68
- Native languages: Tausug; Tagalog

Kalingalan Caluang, officially the Municipality of Kalingalan Caluang (Tausūg: Kawman sin Kalingalan Caluang; Tagalog: Bayan ng Kalingalan Caluang), is a municipality in the province of Sulu, Philippines. According to the 2024 census, it has a population of 42,845 people.

== History ==
The Municipality of Kalingalan Caluang was created on December 6, 1975, by Presidential Decree No. 838 from the barangays of Luuk, Sulu. It was named in honor of Sayyid Captain Kalingalan Caluang, former Governor of Sulu and one of the "Fighting 21" of Sulu during World War II.

== Geography ==
=== Barangays ===
Kalingalan Caluang is politically subdivided into 9 barangays. Each barangay consists of puroks while some have sitios.

- Kambing
- Kanlagay
- Karungdong (Poblacion)
- Masjid Bayle
- Masjid Punjungan
- Pang
- Pangdan Pangdan
- Pitogo
- Tunggol

=== Climate ===
Climate data for Kalingalan Caluang, Sulu
Month	Jan	Feb	Mar	Apr	May	Jun	Jul	Aug	Sep	Oct	Nov	Dec	Year
Mean daily maximum °C (°F)	27 (81)	27 (81)	27 (81)	28 (82)	28 (82)	28 (82)	28 (82)	28 (82)	28 (82)	28 (82)	28 (82)	28 (82)	28 (82)
Mean daily minimum °C (°F)	27 (81)	26 (79)	27 (81)	27 (81)	28 (82)	28 (82)	27 (81)	27 (81)	27 (81)	27 (81)	27 (81)	27 (81)	27 (81)
Average precipitation mm (inches)	152 (6.0)	120 (4.7)	125 (4.9)	132 (5.2)	239 (9.4)	301 (11.9)	281 (11.1)	268 (10.6)	190 (7.5)	263 (10.4)	234 (9.2)	179 (7.0)	2,484 (97.9)
Average rainy days	17.4	14.9	15.8	15.4	22.7	24.4	25.0	23.5	20.5	22.7	21.2	18.7	242.2
Source: Meteoblue (modeled/calculated data, not measured locally)

== Demographics ==
Population census of Kalingalan Caluang
Year	Pop.	±% p.a.
1980	8,639	—
1990	15,824	+6.24%
1995	19,320	+3.81%
2000	22,688	+3.50%
2007	30,046	+3.95%
2010	26,848	−4.01%
2015	31,567	+3.13%
2020	39,549	+4.86%
2024	42,845	+1.94%
Source: Philippine Statistics Authority

== Economy ==
Poverty Incidence of Kalingalan Caluang

Source: Philippine Statistics Authority

== See also ==
- Tausūg people
- Moro National Liberation Front
