= Pata, Sulu =

Municipality in Sulu, Philippines

Pata ڤات
- Municipality
- Municipality of Pata
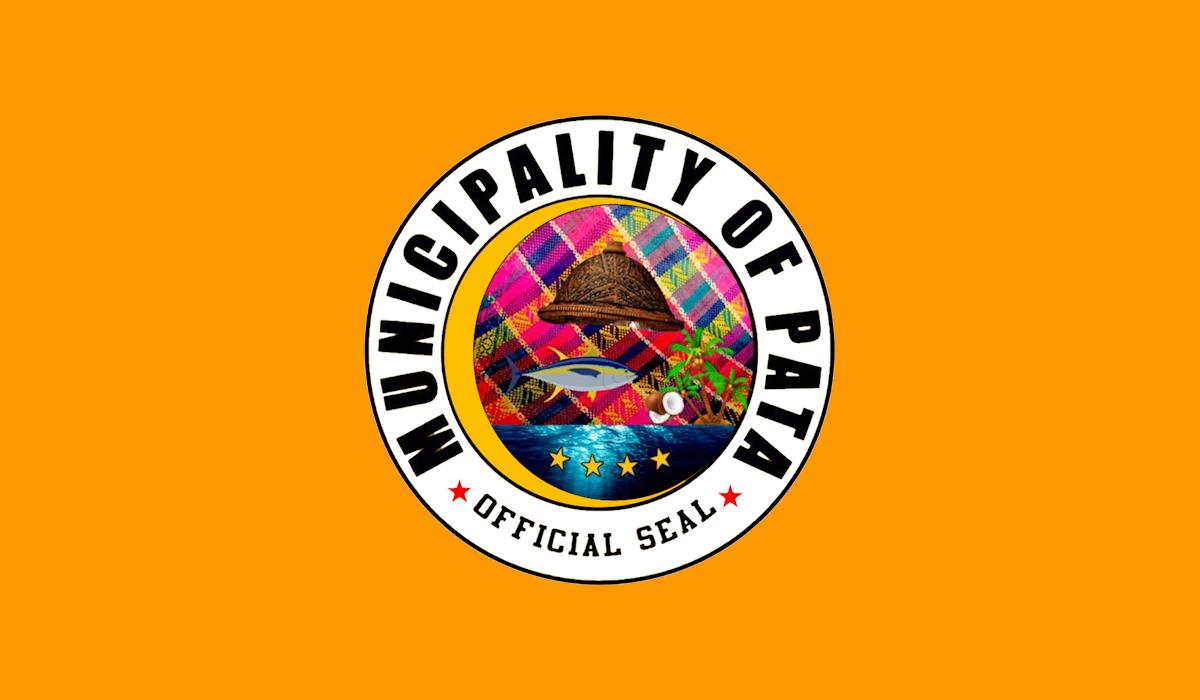
- Flag

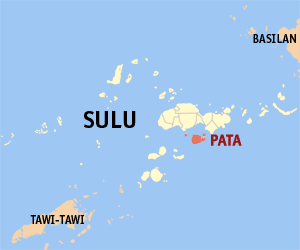
- Map of Sulu with Pata highlighted
- Interactive map of Pata
- Location within the Philippines
- Coordinates: 5°50′40″N 121°08′38″E
- Country: Philippines
- Region: Zamboanga Peninsula
- Province: Sulu
- District: 2nd district
- Barangays: 14 (see Barangays)

Government
  - Type: Sangguniang Bayan
  - Mayor: Abdurauf C. Burahan
  - Vice Mayor: Anton J. Burahan
  - Representative: Munir N. Arbison Jr.
  - Municipal Council: Members: Midzfar A. Jaafar; Caniso J. Abbas; Ulman D. Hasim; Tadzmahal J. Islani; Michael A. Bahara; Abraham A. Sahad; Gulam J. Salad; Aljiber A. Sapilin
  - Electorate: 8,067 voters (2025)

Area
  - Total: 116.99 km^{2} (45.17 sq mi)
- Elevation: 18 m (59 ft)
- Highest elevation: 796 m (2,612 ft)
- Lowest elevation: 0 m (0 ft)

Population (2024 census)
  - Total: 27,974
  - Density: 239.11/km^{2} (619.30/sq mi)
  - Households: 4,169

Economy
  - Income class: 4th municipal income class
  - Poverty incidence: 26.52% (2023)
  - Revenue: ₱ 134.3 million (2022)
  - Assets: ₱ 282.2 million (2022)
  - Expenditure: ₱ 76.36 million (2022)
  - Liabilities: ₱ 39.52 million (2022)

Service provider
  - Electricity: Sulu Electric Cooperative (SULECO)
- Time zone: UTC+8 (PST)
- ZIP code: 7405
- PSGC: 1906610000
- IDD : area code: +63 (0)68
- Native languages: Tausug; Tagalog

Pata, officially the Municipality of Pata (Tausūg: Kawman sin Pata; Tagalog: Bayan ng Pata), is a municipality in the province of Sulu, Philippines. According to the 2024 census, it had a population of 27,974 people.

== History ==
=== Colonial period ===
==== Spanish occupation ====
Spanish authorities conducted an expedition to Pata island in 1887, which became successful despite setbacks encountered by the troops, while inflicting casualties to the natives.

==== Local banditry ====
Pata island was once recorded being inhabited by most warlike Moro tribes in the Sulu Archipelago, and was visited by bandits and pirates for centuries.

It was said that Jikiri, a renegade follower of the Sultan of Sulu, Jamalul Kiram II, who turned into a Moro outlaw leader at the time of American occupation, spent much of his time somewhere in the present-day municipality, recruiting his men. Had been involved in piracy and murders since late 1907, he was killed on the smaller island of Patian (now part of the municipality)—reportedly his birth place—on July 4, 1909, ending a massive manhunt.

Later, conflicts in the Pata began as establishment of schools was opposed. In 1920, the Constabulary and the group of Hatib Sihaban had a clash, the said rebel leader was wounded. By mid-1923, a band of outlaws later killed three residents. Due to worsening peace situation, in May 1923, the Constabulary's two small detachments were combined by its Provisional Commander into a stronger one stationing on Kiput School House.

On the early morning of May 19, the same Moro band of some 300, under Moro Acbara, (Note: 1923 attack: The secretary of the interior reported (1924) that the band of outlaws were led by Moro Acbara; and 23 persons were killed in an encounter.; According to Hurley (1938), the Moro force were under Ackbara, Ujaman, and Hatik; and the Constabulary killed 22 of the bandits.) surrounded the school and attacked the detachment inside. An encounter left more than 20 dead and led the rest of the bandits to retreat; the Constabulary were left unharmed.

The incident led authorities to send an expeditionary force of 120 which conducted a march on the island on the 28th. In later military operations, the stronghold of the outlaws was attacked, and fierce fighting killed 45 of the rebels. The leaders escaped; Acbara was later killed by an arresting councilman; Hatib Sihaban and his followers surrendered.

=== Contemporary ===
==== Conversion into municipality ====
By virtue of Executive Order No. 355, signed by President Carlos P. Garcia on August 26, 1959, twenty of 21 remaining municipal districts of then-undivided Sulu, including Pata, were converted into municipalities effective July 1, 1958.

==== Later events ====
On December 23, 1959, bandits raided two houses occupied by 23 persons, killing 19 of them in a massacre.

In 1981, two major incidents occurred involving the Moro National Liberation Front, which had seeking Muslim rule in the southern Philippines. On February 12, an attack by some 200 secessionists under Unad Musillan killed 119 officers and men (Note: February 1981 attack: Most sources mentioned that 119 government troops were killed. Initial sources reported as high as 124.) of the Army's 31st Infantry Battalion, 1st Infantry Division, led by Lt. Col. Jacinto Sarudal, which had been deployed on the island, in the largest single death toll in an encounter between the Moro separatists and the military. The government retaliated by launching series of assault operations against Muslim rebels, causing deaths of hundreds of villagers. As a result, 14,000 inhabitants faced starvation due to their restricted movements; and in April, 2–3 thousand Muslims left the town.

On November 20, a 15-man Army platoon were ambushed by about 30 rebels in Barangay Cawayan. Ten of the soldiers including their leader 2Lt. Antonio Yap, as well as two of the attackers, were killed.

== Geography ==
=== Barangays ===
Pata is politically subdivided into 14 barangays. Each barangay consists of puroks while some have sitios.

- Andalan
- Daungdong
- Kamawi
- Kanjarang
- Kayawan
- Kiput
- Likud
- Luuk-tulay
- Niog-niog
- Patian
- Pisak-pisak
- Saimbangon (Poblacion)
- Sangkap
- Timuddas

=== Climate ===
Climate data for Pata, Sulu
Month	Jan	Feb	Mar	Apr	May	Jun	Jul	Aug	Sep	Oct	Nov	Dec	Year
Mean daily maximum °C (°F)	27 (81)	27 (81)	27 (81)	28 (82)	28 (82)	28 (82)	28 (82)	28 (82)	28 (82)	28 (82)	28 (82)	28 (82)	28 (82)
Mean daily minimum °C (°F)	27 (81)	26 (79)	27 (81)	27 (81)	28 (82)	28 (82)	28 (82)	28 (82)	28 (82)	28 (82)	28 (82)	27 (81)	28 (81)
Average precipitation mm (inches)	170 (6.7)	130 (5.1)	125 (4.9)	122 (4.8)	229 (9.0)	286 (11.3)	254 (10.0)	248 (9.8)	182 (7.2)	257 (10.1)	233 (9.2)	188 (7.4)	2,424 (95.5)
Average rainy days	18.3	15.3	15.2	14.6	22.8	24.0	24.3	23.3	20.5	22.6	21.9	19.3	242.1
Source: Meteoblue (modeled/calculated data, not measured locally)

== Demographics ==
Population census of Pata
Year	Pop.	±% p.a.
1939	9,105	—
1948	6,795	−3.20%
1960	6,657	−0.17%
1970	8,077	+1.95%
1975	4,379	−11.55%
1980	7,213	+10.49%
1990	9,244	+2.51%
1995	10,065	+1.61%
2000	11,791	+3.45%
2007	20,095	+7.63%
2010	14,918	−10.27%
2015	22,163	+7.83%
2020	24,736	+2.34%
2024	27,974	+3.00%
Source: Philippine Statistics Authority

== Economy ==
Poverty Incidence of Pata

Source: Philippine Statistics Authority
