= Luuk, Sulu =

Municipality in Sulu, Philippines

Luuk لُؤُكْ
- Municipality
- Municipality of Luuk
- Seal

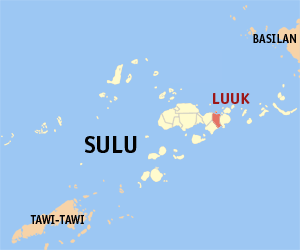
- Map of Sulu with Luuk highlighted
- Interactive map of Luuk
- Location within the Philippines
- Coordinates: 5°58′03″N 121°18′48″E
- Country: Philippines
- Region: Zamboanga Peninsula
- Province: Sulu
- District: 2nd district
- Barangays: 12 (see Barangays)

Government
  - Type: Sangguniang Bayan
  - Mayor: Maryam N. Arbison
  - Vice Mayor: Arnel N. Arbison
  - Representative: Munir N. Arbison Jr.
  - Municipal Council: Members: Angie M. Wee; Muhirma R. Parantes; Dalma A. Arbison; Abdurajik S. Abbas; Armaida A. Alam; Ainun H. Jimbol; Piandao M. Hamsani; Josefina N. Mukim
  - Electorate: 28,547 voters (2025)

Area
  - Total: 313.04 km^{2} (120.87 sq mi)
- Elevation: 72 m (236 ft)
- Highest elevation: 333 m (1,093 ft)
- Lowest elevation: 0 m (0 ft)

Population (2024 census)
  - Total: 44,741
  - Density: 142.92/km^{2} (370.17/sq mi)
  - Households: 6,554

Economy
  - Income class: 3rd municipal income class
  - Poverty incidence: 15.9% (2023)
  - Revenue: ₱ 174.2 million (2022)
  - Assets: ₱ 305 million (2022)
  - Expenditure: ₱ 148.2 million (2022)
  - Liabilities: ₱ 90.99 million (2022)

Service provider
  - Electricity: Sulu Electric Cooperative (SULECO)
- Time zone: UTC+8 (PST)
- ZIP code: 7404
- PSGC: 1906604000
- IDD : area code: +63 (0)68
- Native languages: Tausug; Tagalog
- Website: www.luuksulu.com

Luuk, officially the Municipality of Luuk (Tausūg: Kawman sin Luuk; Filipino: Bayan ng Luuk), is a municipality in the province of Sulu, Philippines. According to the 2024 census, it has a population of 44,741 people.

On July 14, 2007, 8 of its barangays were constituted into the separate municipality of Omar, Sulu.

== History ==
Luuk was the main site of the violent Kamlon Revolt in 1951. This municipality was once a warzone where the government forces and the Muslim rebels would engage frequently for a span of 5–7 years.

== Geography ==
=== Barangays ===
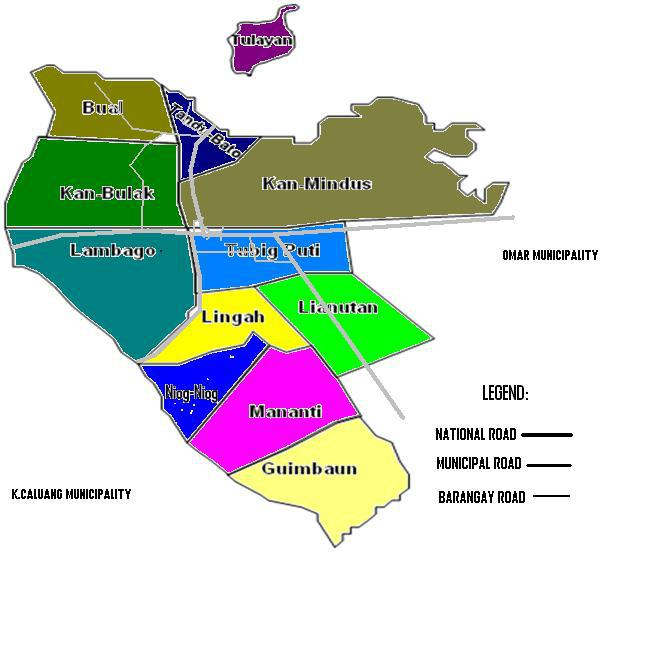
Political map of Luuk

Luuk is politically subdivided into 12 barangays. Each barangay consists of puroks while some have sitios.

- Bual
- Guimbaun
- Kan-Bulak
- Kan-Mindus
- Lambago
- Lianutan
- Lingah
- Mananti
- Niog-niog
- Tandu-Bato
- Tubig-Puti (Poblacion)
- Tulayan Island

=== Climate ===
Climate data for Luuk, Sulu
Month	Jan	Feb	Mar	Apr	May	Jun	Jul	Aug	Sep	Oct	Nov	Dec	Year
Mean daily maximum °C (°F)	27 (81)	27 (81)	27 (81)	28 (82)	28 (82)	28 (82)	28 (82)	28 (82)	28 (82)	28 (82)	28 (82)	28 (82)	28 (82)
Mean daily minimum °C (°F)	27 (81)	26 (79)	27 (81)	27 (81)	28 (82)	28 (82)	27 (81)	27 (81)	27 (81)	27 (81)	27 (81)	27 (81)	27 (81)
Average precipitation mm (inches)	152 (6.0)	120 (4.7)	125 (4.9)	132 (5.2)	239 (9.4)	301 (11.9)	281 (11.1)	268 (10.6)	190 (7.5)	263 (10.4)	234 (9.2)	179 (7.0)	2,484 (97.9)
Average rainy days	17.4	14.9	15.8	15.4	22.7	24.4	25.0	23.5	20.5	22.7	21.2	18.7	242.2
Source: Meteoblue (modeled/calculated data, not measured locally)

== Demographics ==
Population census of Luuk
Year	Pop.	±% p.a.
1903	700	—
1918	18,351	+24.33%
1939	27,878	+2.01%
1948	16,726	−5.52%
1960	18,852	+1.00%
1970	26,860	+3.60%
1975	21,354	−4.50%
1980	19,669	−1.63%
1990	29,378	+4.09%
1995	31,705	+1.44%
2000	38,819	+4.44%
2007	33,508	−2.01%
2010	29,897	−4.06%
2015	32,162	+1.40%
2020	37,873	+3.50%
2024	44,741	+4.08%
Source: Philippine Statistics Authority

== Economy ==
Poverty Incidence of Luuk

Source: Philippine Statistics Authority
