= Panamao =

Municipality in Sulu, Philippines

Panamao ڤنمااو
- Municipality
- Municipality of Panamao
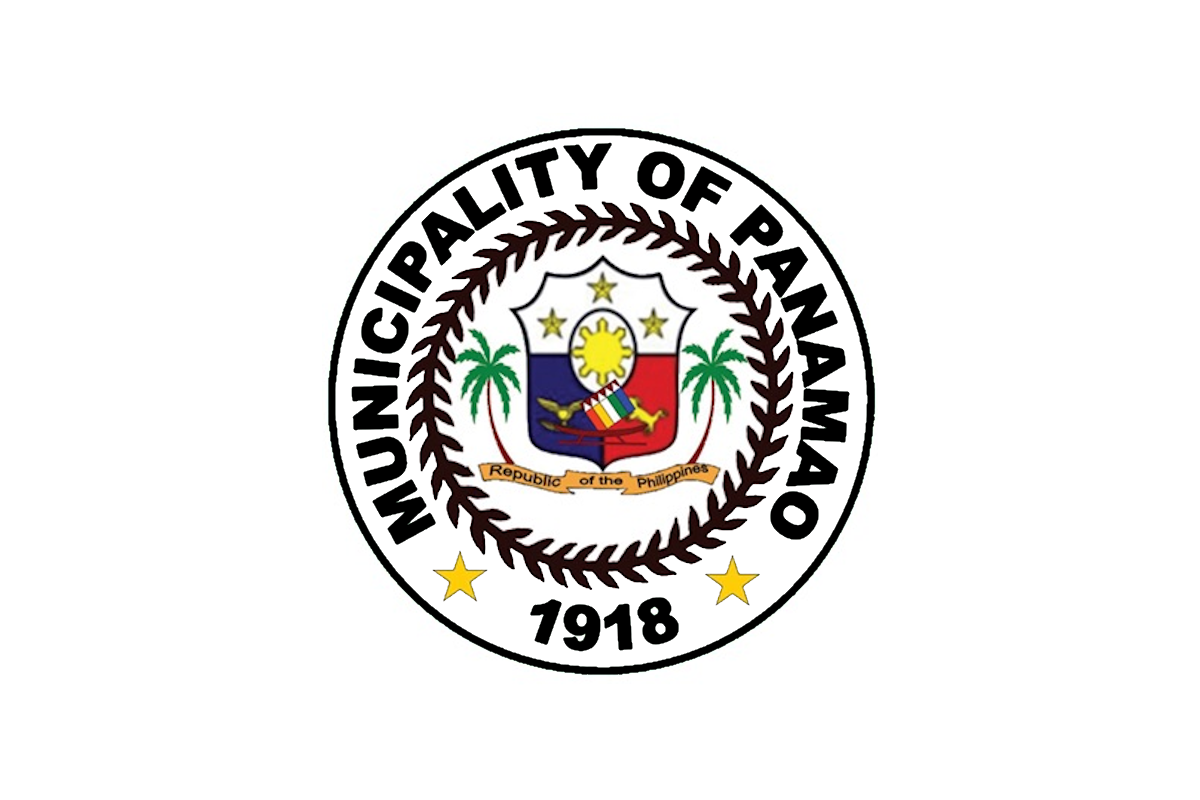
- Flag
- Nickname: Old Panamao
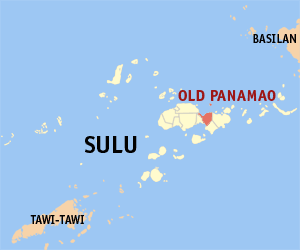
- Map of Sulu with Panamao highlighted
- Interactive map of Panamao
- Location within the Philippines
- Coordinates: 5°58′50″N 121°12′51″E
- Country: Philippines
- Region: Zamboanga Peninsula
- Province: Sulu
- District: 2nd district
- Barangays: 31 (see Barangays)

Government
  - Type: Sangguniang Bayan
  - Mayor: Al-Frazier S. Abdurajak
  - Vice Mayor: Renden H. Abdurajak
  - Representative: Munir N. Arbison Jr.
  - Municipal Council: Members: Halmie L. Sarab; Eti J. Abdusalim; Sakandal A. Ammad; Hataie A. Asanulla; Husnolbasar S. Arao; Nurlita T. Talib; Lasanda L. Asanji; Abdusuil M. Hadil
  - Electorate: 23,701 voters (2025)

Area
  - Total: 107.57 km^{2} (41.53 sq mi)
- Elevation: 49 m (161 ft)
- Highest elevation: 419 m (1,375 ft)
- Lowest elevation: 0 m (0 ft)

Population (2024 census)
  - Total: 30,847
  - Density: 286.76/km^{2} (742.71/sq mi)
  - Households: 7,846

Economy
  - Income class: 2nd municipal income class
  - Poverty incidence: 22.71% (2023)
  - Revenue: ₱ 195.2 million (2022)
  - Assets: ₱ 167.3 million (2022)
  - Expenditure: ₱ 190 million (2022)
  - Liabilities: ₱ 32.63 million (2022)

Service provider
  - Electricity: Sulu Electric Cooperative (SULECO)
- Time zone: UTC+8 (PST)
- ZIP code: 7402
- PSGC: 1906607000
- IDD : area code: +63 (0)68
- Native languages: Tausug; Tagalog

Panamao, officially the Municipality of Panamao (Tausūg: Kawman sin Panamao; Tagalog: Bayan ng Panamao), is a municipality in the province of Sulu, Philippines. According to the 2024 census, it has a population of 30,847 people.

== Geography ==
=== Barangays ===
Panamao is politically subdivided into 31 barangays. Each barangay consists of puroks while some have sitios.

- Asin
- Bakud
- Bangday
- Baunoh
- Bitanag
- Bud Seit
- Bulangsi
- Datag
- Kamalig
- Kan Asaali
- Kan Ukol
- Kan-Dayok
- Kan-Sipat
- Kawasan
- Kulay-kulay
- Lakit
- Lower Patibulan
- Lunggang
- Parang
- Pugad Manaul
- Puhagan
- Seit Higad
- Seit Lake (Poblacion)
- Su-uh
- Tabu Manuk
- Tandu-tandu
- Tayungan
- Tinah
- Tubig Gantang
- Tubig Jati
- Upper Patibulan

=== Climate ===
Climate data for Panamao, Sulu
Month	Jan	Feb	Mar	Apr	May	Jun	Jul	Aug	Sep	Oct	Nov	Dec	Year
Mean daily maximum °C (°F)	27 (81)	27 (81)	27 (81)	28 (82)	28 (82)	28 (82)	28 (82)	28 (82)	28 (82)	28 (82)	28 (82)	28 (82)	28 (82)
Mean daily minimum °C (°F)	27 (81)	26 (79)	27 (81)	27 (81)	28 (82)	28 (82)	27 (81)	28 (82)	28 (82)	28 (82)	27 (81)	27 (81)	27 (81)
Average precipitation mm (inches)	152 (6.0)	120 (4.7)	125 (4.9)	132 (5.2)	239 (9.4)	301 (11.9)	281 (11.1)	268 (10.6)	190 (7.5)	263 (10.4)	234 (9.2)	179 (7.0)	2,484 (97.9)
Average rainy days	17.4	14.9	15.8	15.4	22.7	24.4	25.0	23.5	20.5	22.7	21.2	18.7	242.2
Source: Meteoblue (modeled/calculated data, not measured locally)

== Demographics ==
Population census of Panamao
Year	Pop.	±% p.a.
1903	253	—
1918	6,808	+24.55%
1939	10,414	+2.04%
1948	6,506	−5.09%
1960	13,042	+5.97%
1970	17,431	+2.94%
1975	20,606	+3.41%
1980	21,105	+0.48%
1990	27,189	+2.57%
1995	28,549	+0.92%
2000	35,906	+5.04%
2007	49,903	+4.64%
2010	37,933	−9.50%
2015	40,998	+1.49%
2020	49,849	+4.20%
2024	30,847	−10.88%
Source: Philippine Statistics Authority

== Economy ==
Poverty Incidence of Panamao

Source: Philippine Statistics Authority
