= Pandami =

Municipality in Sulu, Philippines

Pandami ڤندامي Lapak
- Municipality
- Municipality of Pandami
- Seal

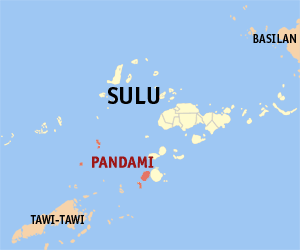
- Map of Sulu with Pandami highlighted
- Interactive map of Pandami
- Location within the Philippines
- Coordinates: 5°32′32″N 120°48′05″E
- Country: Philippines
- Region: Zamboanga Peninsula
- Province: Sulu
- District: 2nd district
- Barangays: 16 (see Barangays)

Government
  - Type: Sangguniang Bayan
  - Mayor: Nurhan S. Berto
  - Vice Mayor: Rakib P. Pulahong
  - Representative: Munir N. Arbison Jr.
  - Municipal Council: Members: Arsid P. Ilaji; Nuridjam A. Putalan; Nurhakim G. Jaini; Abraham J. Putalan; Mohammad Alsharif R. Balla; Nasirin A. Sitin; Bensaudi A. Marajuki; Jamar E. Gonzales
  - Electorate: 15,386 voters (2025)

Area
  - Total: 170.89 km^{2} (65.98 sq mi)
- Elevation: 7.0 m (23.0 ft)
- Highest elevation: 487 m (1,598 ft)
- Lowest elevation: 0 m (0 ft)

Population (2024 census)
  - Total: 35,369
  - Density: 206.97/km^{2} (536.05/sq mi)
  - Households: 6,148

Economy
  - Income class: 3rd municipal income class
  - Poverty incidence: 14.58% (2023)
  - Revenue: ₱ 186.2 million (2022)
  - Assets: ₱ 306 million (2022)
  - Expenditure: ₱ 99.75 million (2022)
  - Liabilities: ₱ 122.6 million (2022)

Service provider
  - Electricity: Sulu Electric Cooperative (SULECO)
- Time zone: UTC+8 (PST)
- ZIP code: 7400
- PSGC: 1906618000
- IDD : area code: +63 (0)68
- Native languages: Tausug; Tagalog

Pandami, officially the Municipality of Pandami (Tausūg: Kawman sin Pandami; Tagalog: Bayan ng Pandami), is a municipality in the province of Sulu, Philippines. According to the 2024 census, it has a population of 35,369 people.

== Geography ==
=== Barangays ===
Pandami is politically subdivided into 16 barangays. Each barangay consists of puroks while some have sitios.

- Baligtang
- Bud Sibaud
- Hambilan
- Kabbon
- Lahi
- Lapak
- Laud Sibaud
- Malanta
- Mamanok
- North Manubul
- Parian Dakula
- Sibaud Proper
- Siganggang
- South Manubul
- Suba-suba
- Tenga Manubul

=== Climate ===
Climate data for Pandami, Sulu
Month	Jan	Feb	Mar	Apr	May	Jun	Jul	Aug	Sep	Oct	Nov	Dec	Year
Mean daily maximum °C (°F)	27 (81)	27 (81)	27 (81)	28 (82)	28 (82)	28 (82)	28 (82)	28 (82)	28 (82)	28 (82)	28 (82)	27 (81)	28 (82)
Mean daily minimum °C (°F)	26 (79)	26 (79)	26 (79)	27 (81)	27 (81)	27 (81)	27 (81)	27 (81)	27 (81)	27 (81)	27 (81)	27 (81)	27 (81)
Average precipitation mm (inches)	184 (7.2)	143 (5.6)	144 (5.7)	136 (5.4)	240 (9.4)	301 (11.9)	272 (10.7)	253 (10.0)	183 (7.2)	265 (10.4)	246 (9.7)	208 (8.2)	2,575 (101.4)
Average rainy days	18.6	15.8	16.9	15.7	23.3	24.2	24.6	23.2	20.5	23.0	22.2	20.4	248.4
Source: Meteoblue (modeled/calculated data, not measured locally)

== Demographics ==
Population census of Pandami
Year	Pop.	±% p.a.
1990	17,159	—
1995	18,181	+1.09%
2000	19,964	+2.03%
2007	23,527	+2.29%
2010	22,474	−1.65%
2015	25,885	+2.73%
2020	33,177	+5.36%
2024	35,369	+1.55%
Source: Philippine Statistics Authority

== Economy ==
Poverty Incidence of Pandami

Source: Philippine Statistics Authority
