= Sulu =

Province in Zamboanga Peninsula, Philippines

Sulu Lupa' Sūg لُفَأْ سُوْݢْ
- Province
- Province of Sulu
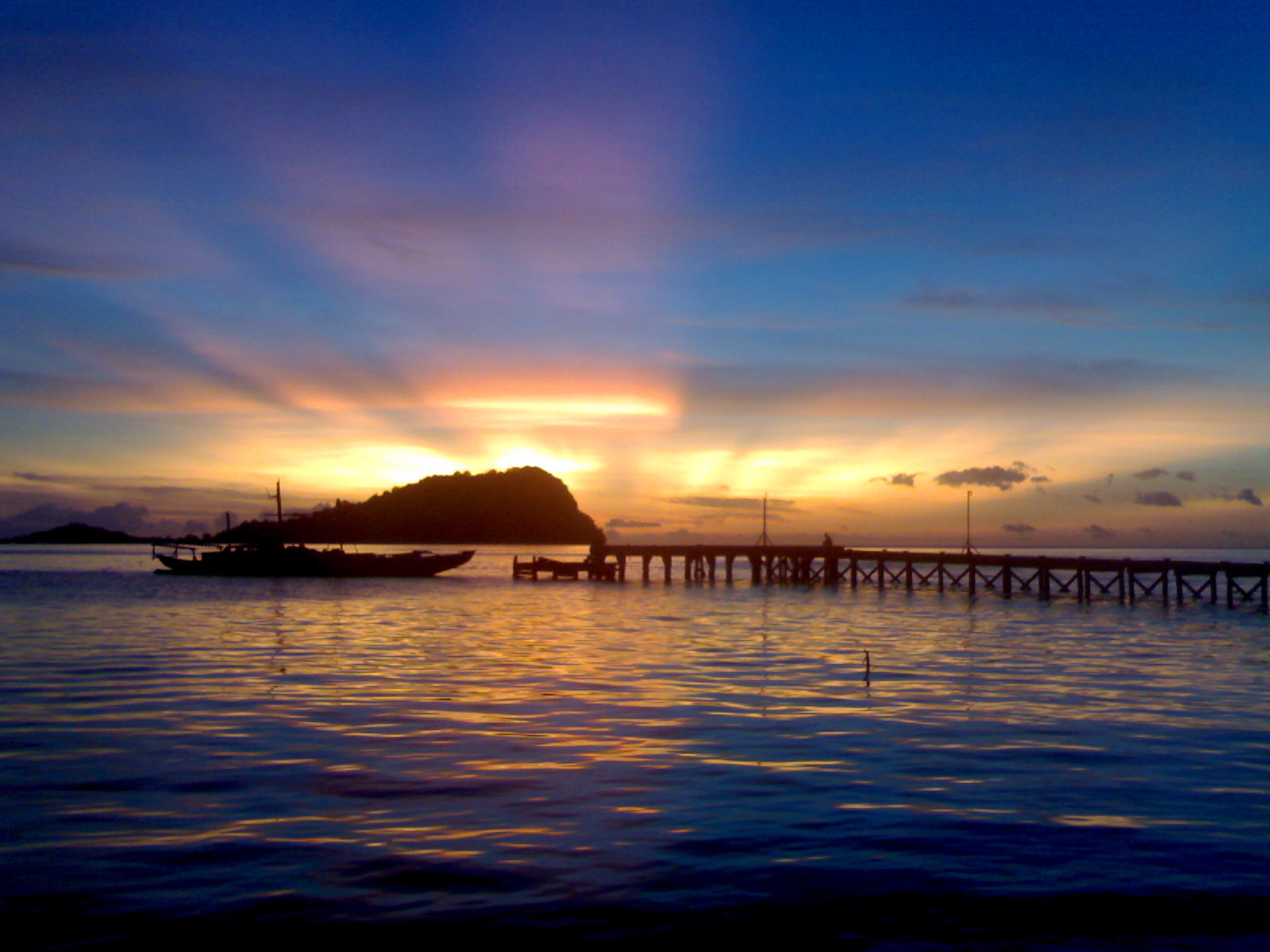
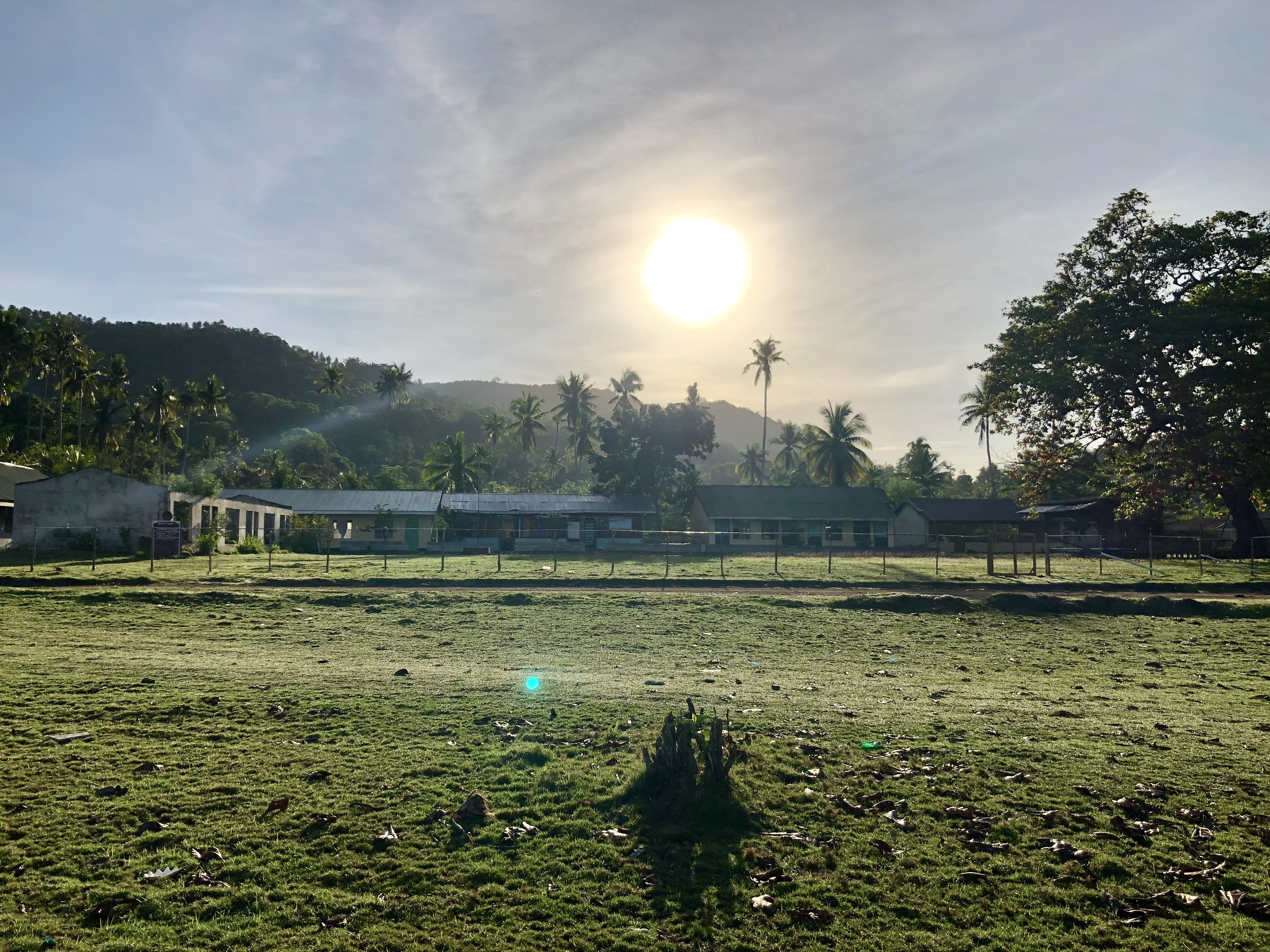
- (from the top, left to right) Sulu Provincial Capitol Building in Jolo, scenery in Hadji Panglima Tahil, sunrise in Lugus and Tulay Mosque in Jolo

- Flag Seal
- Nickname(s): Pearl of the Sulu Sea; Stronghold of Islam in the Philippines; Gateway of Islam to the Philippines
- Motto: Build Back Better Sulu
- Location in the Philippines
- Interactive map of Sulu
- Coordinates: 6°N 121°E
- Country: Philippines
- Region: Zamboanga Peninsula
- Founded: September 1, 1914
- Capital and largest municipality: Jolo
- Government seat: Patikul

Government
  - Type: Sangguniang Panlalawigan
  - Governor: Abdusakur A. Tan II (Lakas)
  - Vice Governor: Abdusakur M. Tan (Lakas)
  - Legislature: Sulu Provincial Board
  - Electorate: 464,393 voters (2025)

Area
  - Total: 1,600.40 km^{2} (617.92 sq mi)
  - Rank: 66th out of 82
- Highest elevation (Mount Bagsak): 1,142 m (3,747 ft)

Population (2024 census)
  - Total: 1,146,097
  - Rank: 28th out of 82
  - Density: 716.132/km^{2} (1,854.77/sq mi)
  - Rank: 10th out of 82
  - Households: 166,140
- Demonyms: Suluan; Tausug; Suluanon

Divisions
  - Independent cities: 0
  - Component cities: 0
  - Municipalities: 19: Banguingui; Hadji Panglima Tahil; Indanan; Jolo; Kalingalan Caluang; Lugus; Luuk; Maimbung; Omar; Panamao; Pandami; Panglima Estino; Pangutaran; Parang; Pata; Patikul; Siasi; Talipao; Tapul
  - Barangays: 410
  - Districts: Legislative districts of Sulu

Economy
  - Income class: 1st provincial income class
  - Poverty incidence: 13% (2023)
  - Revenue: ₱ 2,121 million (2024)
  - Assets: ₱ 5,790 million (2024)
  - Expenditure: ₱ 1,707 million (2024)
  - Liabilities: ₱ 816.8 million (2024)
- Time zone: UTC+8 (PHT)
- PSGC: 0906600000
- IDD : area code: +63 (0)68
- ISO 3166 code: PH-SLU
- Spoken languages: Tausug; Sinama; Tagalog; English; Sabah Malay; Chavacano
- Website: www.sulu.gov.ph

Sulu ([sʊˈlu]), officially the Province of Sulu (Tausug: Wilaya' sin Lupa' Sūg; Filipino: Lalawigan ng Sulu; Chavacano: Provincia de Sulu); is a province of the Philippines in the Sulu Archipelago and part of the Zamboanga Peninsula region.

It was part of the Bangsamoro Autonomous Region in Muslim Mindanao (BARMM), until the Supreme Court of the Philippines on September 9, 2024, declared its inclusion to be unconstitutional because of the province's simple majority vote against it during the 2019 Bangsamoro autonomy plebiscite.

Its capital is Jolo on the island of the same name. Maimbung, the royal capital of the Sultanate of Sulu, is also located in the province. Sulu is along the southern border of the Sulu Sea and the northern boundary of the Celebes Sea.

== History ==
=== Early history ===
Prior to the arrival of Islam in Sulu, the province used to adhere to local animist religions; this later changed to Hindu and Buddhist belief systems. Throughout this time, the Kingdom of Lupah Sug had been established centuries before Islam arrived.

The advent of Islam around 1138 through merchants and traders had a distinct influence on Southeast Asia. The coming of Arabs, Persians and other Muslims paved the way for the arrival of religious missionaries, traders, scholars and travelers to Sulu and Mindanao in the 12th century.

Painting of Sulu home & coconut plantation

A landmark born of the social process was the founding of the Sultanate of Sulu. Year 1380 CE, The Sunni Sufi Scholar Karim-ul Makhdum came to Sulu and introduced Islam to the Philippines. In 1450 CE, Johore-born Arab adventurer Sayyid Abubakar Abirin came to Sulu and lived with Rajah Baguinda Ali. The Sunni Sufi Teacher and Sayyid Abubakar eventually married Ali's daughter, Dayang-dayang Paramisuli, and inherited Rajah Baguinda's polity (which was a principality before), which he turned into the Sultanate of Sulu and become its first Sultan. To consolidate his rule, Sayyid Abubakar united the local political units under the umbrella of the Sultanate. A Sultanate that followed the Ash'ari Aqeeda, Shafi'i Madh'hab and Sufism. He brought Sulu, Zamboanga Peninsula, Palawan, and Basilan under its aegis.

=== Spanish colonial era ===
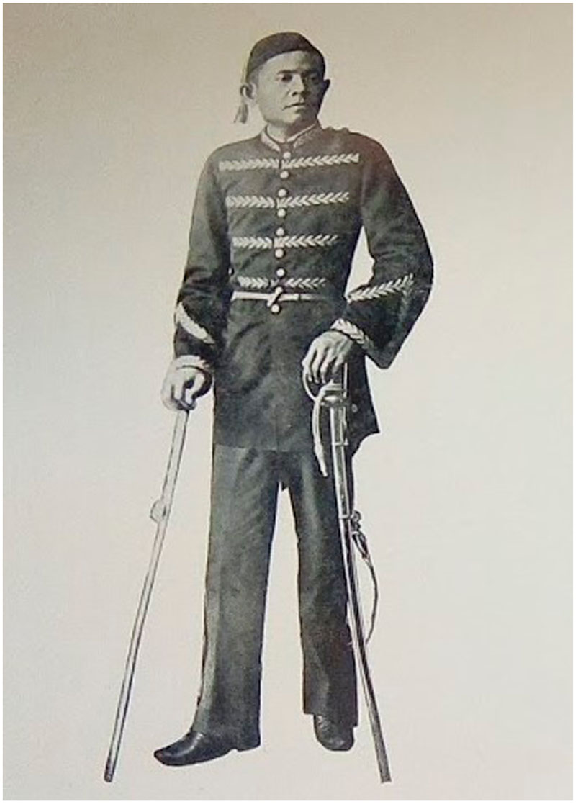
Sultan Harun Ar-Rashid in 1886, Sultan of Sulu from 1886 to 1894

The navigational error that landed Ferdinand Magellan in Limasawa, brought awareness of Europe to the Philippines and opened the door to Spanish colonial incursion. The Spaniards introduced Christianity and a political system of church-state dichotomy, which encountered fierce resistance in the devastating Moro wars from 1578 to 1899. The Sultanate of Sulu formally recognised Spanish sovereignty in Tawi-Tawi and Sulu in middle of the 19th century, but these areas remained partially ruled by the Spanish as their sovereignty was limited to military stations, garrisons, and pockets of civilian settlements, until they had to abandon the region as a consequence of their defeat in the Spanish–American War.

=== American era ===
After Spain ceded the Philippines to the United States, American forces came to Jolo and ended the 23 years of Spanish military occupation (1876 to 1899). On August 20, Sultan Jamalul Kiram II and Brig. Gen. John C. Bates signed the Bates Agreement that continued the gradual emasculation of the Sultanate started by Spain (Treaty of 1878) until March 1915 when the Sultan abdicated his temporal powers in the Carpenter Agreement. The Agreement eliminated opposition to the civilian government of Gov. Clinton Solidum.

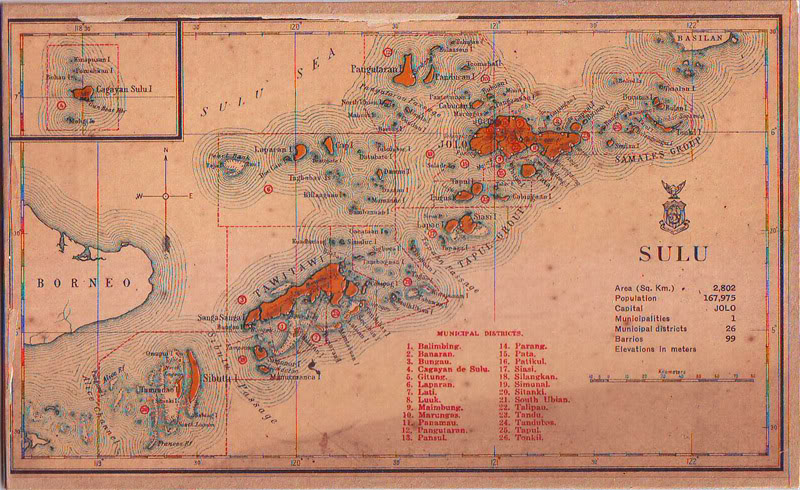
Sulu in 1918, which covered the current province of Tawi-Tawi

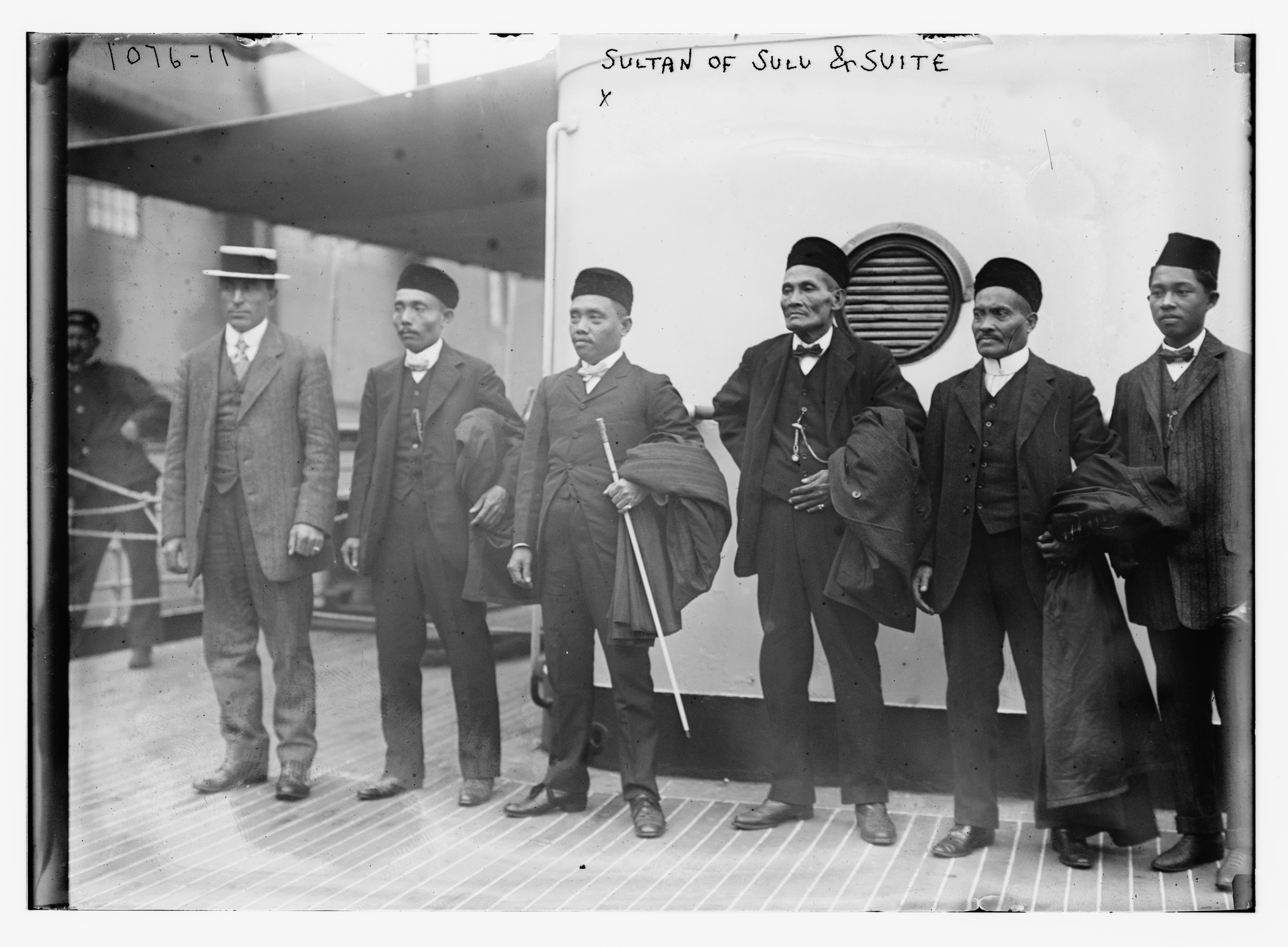
Sultan Jamalul Kiram II and Suite, published by Bain News Service

The Department of Mindanao and Sulu under Gov. Carpenter was created by Philippine Commission Act 2309 (1914) and ended on February 5, 1920, by Act of Philippine Legislature No. 2878. The Bureau of Non-Christian Tribes was organized and briefly headed by Teofisto Guingona Sr. With the enactment by the US Congress of the Jones Law (Philippine Autonomy Law) in 1916, ultimate Philippine independence was guaranteed and the Filipinization of public administration began. Sulu, however, had an appointed American governor until 1935, and the Governor General in Manila had a say in Sulu affairs.

At any rate, the essence of local governance forged by Rajah Baguinda continued to permeate the ethos of Sulu politics despite centuries of colonial presence. History points to a local government in Sulu that antedates other similar systems in the country.

The province hosted the Daru Jambangan (Palace of Flowers) which was the royal palace of the Sultan of Sulu since historical times. The palace, located in Maimbung was made of wood, and was destroyed in 1932 by a huge storm.

=== Japanese occupation ===
During the brief Japanese occupation years, Sulu was bombed by the Japanese and was conquered afterwards. The Japanese were eventually expelled by the Americans and the natives of Sulu, and the Americans started to push for the independence of the Philippines as 'one country'. This prompted various leaders from Mindanao and the Sulu archipelago to campaign against being lumped with the Catholic natives of Luzon and the Visayas. Despite the campaign against the 'one Philippines model', the United States granted independence to the Philippines, effectively giving control of Mindanao and the Sulu archipelago to the Filipino government in Manila.

It was during this period that the fighting 21 of Sulu rose with Lt. Abdulrahim Imao and Sayyid Captain Kalingalan Caluang who distinguished himself through extraordinary valor and leadership, earning widespread recognition and commendation. The Fighting 21 of Sulu was narrated by Ernesto M. Espaldon in his book. Among Sayyid Captain Kalingalan Caluang's notable accolades was the prestigious Bronze Star Medal, awarded on February 4, 1944, under Executive Order No.9419 by the Commanding General of the 41st Infantry Division, for his meritorious achievements in the Sulu Archipelago, Philippine Islands. His exceptional acts of leadership, strategic resourcefulness, and decisive initiative during pivotal moments were highly praised. Despite facing harsh conditions and relentless enemy engagement, Captain Caluang demonstrated unwavering courage, sound judgment, and a steadfast commitment to duty.

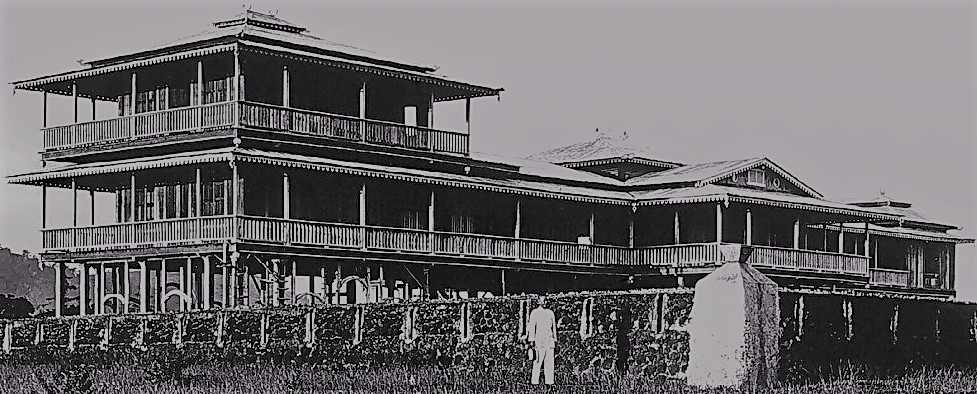
Daru Jambangan (Palace of Flowers) in Maimbung before it was destroyed by a typhoon. The palace was the seat of the Sultanate of Sulu's reigning monarch for generations.

=== Philippine independence ===
At the beginning of Philippine independence era, the reconstruction of the Daru Jambangan continued to be of huge importance to the people of Sulu as only a few arches and posts remain from the once grand palace complex. Many members of the royal family advocated for the reconstruction of the palace, however, the government of the Philippines made no official position or fund for the matter. During that time, the Mindanao sentiment to become a free country on its own was also felt in Sulu.

In 1948, Hadji Kamlon, a World War II veteran, started an uprising on Luuk, Sulu. He surrendered in 1949 but started another uprising in 1952. He then surrendered on July 31, 1952, to Secretary of Defense Ramon Magsaysay. However, he started a third uprising a week later. He surrendered again on November 9, 1952, but would start another uprising in early 1953. He would then surrender on August 11, 1953, after an encounter with Philippines Government troops. He violated the terms of his surrender a week later. Two years later, on September 24, 1955, he would then surrender after an encounter with government troops in Tandu Panuan, Luuk.

In 1973, the municipalities of South Ubian, Tandubas, Simunul, Sitangkai, Balimbing (Panglima Sugala), Bungao, Cagayan de Sulu (Mapun), and Turtle Island were transferred from the jurisdiction of Sulu to the newly formed province of Tawi-Tawi pursuant to Presidential Decree No. 302 of September 11, 1973.

As a center of regional commerce, Sulu became very prosperous and progressive in the years after the end of World War II and the establishment of the Third Philippine Republic. By 1970, the province ranked 37rd in the Philippines in terms of number of households with piped water, and 38th in terms of households with electricity. As the capital of the province, Jolo even saw international trade with countries like China and Russia. This changed suddenly after the 1974 Siege of Jolo, which destroyed infrastructure and led to capital flight and brain drain. By 1990 Jolo had dropped to 52nd in terms of number of households with piped water and 73rd in terms of households with electricity.

==== The Marcos Administration ====
During Marcos era, Sulu was one of the provinces that fought back against Ferdinand Marcos as his regime tortured, killed, and exterminated hundreds of Moros. When news broke out regarding the planned invasion of eastern Sabah, Marcos ordered the military to massacre Tausug warriors, which led to the brutal 1968 Jabidah massacre, the worst human rights violation against the natives of Sulu.

News about the Jabidah Massacre led to the rise of numerous separatist movements in Mindanao, including Sulu, eventually leading to groups engaging in armed conflict with the Philippine government. One of the most destructive clashes, the 1974 Battle of Jolo, was so destructive that it was estimated to have rendered 40,000 people homeless in Jolo, the capital of Sulu.

The Sultan of Sulu, members of the royal family, and the leaders of Sulu were in favor of the People Power Revolution in Manila that successfully toppled the dictatorship and restored democracy in the country.

=== Contemporary ===
In 1989, the province of Sulu became part of the Autonomous Region in Muslim Mindanao or ARMM. A peace pact between the Moro National Liberation Front or MNLF and the Philippine government was also made. The founder and leader of the MNLF, Nur Misuari, who was a native of Sulu and follower of the Sultanate of Sulu, became the governor of the entire ARMM from 1996 to 2001.

In 2016, a small replica of Daru Jambangan was built in the neighboring town of Talipao and became a centerpiece for a 'vacation park'. The replica was about 25% of the actual size of the real Daru Jambangan during its heyday. A campaign to restore the Daru Jambangan in its original location in Maimbung is still ongoing. The National Commission for Culture and the Arts and the National Museum of the Philippines were tasked to faithfully restore or reconstruct the Daru Jambangan in Maimbung.

In 2019, the Bangsamoro autonomy plebiscite led to the ratification of the Bangsamoro Organic Law (BOL) creating the Bangsamoro Autonomous Region in Muslim Mindanao (BARMM) to replace the ARMM. The initiative lost by a 54.3% margin in Sulu, but was carried nonetheless because the votes of the entire ARMM were counted as one. However, in September 2024, the Supreme Court ruled that Sulu should have not been made part of Bangsamoro. The status of which administrative region Sulu belonged to was initially unclear although the Commission on Elections en banc had the consensus that Sulu should revert to the Zamboanga Peninsula, the region it belonged to prior its inclusion in the ARMM back in 1989. It was also proposed that Sulu become a "pilot province" under the Office of the President. Sulu's exclusion was challenged but Supreme Court ruled in finality its decision on November 26, 2024.

Sulu was formally reverted to Zamboanga Peninsula by the virtue of Executive Order No. 91, signed by President Bongbong Marcos on July 30, 2025.

== Geography ==
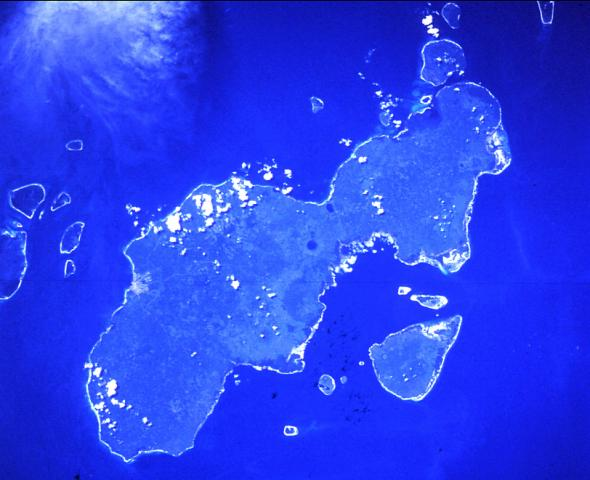
Jolo and its adjacent islets seen from space

The province covers an area of 1,600.40 square kilometres (617.92 sq mi). Sulu's main island, Jolo, has an area of 868.5 square kilometres (335.3 sq mi), making it the 16th largest island of the Philippine Archipelago by area.

Sulu is a part of the Sulu Archipelago, which stretches from the tip of the Zamboanga Peninsula on the north to the island of Borneo in the south. The main island and its islets are situated between the island-provinces of Basilan to the northeast, and Tawi-Tawi to the southwest. Sulu is bordered by two seas; the Sulu Sea to the north, and the Celebes Sea to its south. Sulu has over 157 islets, some of which remain unnamed.

The islands are organized into four groups:

- Jolo group
- Pangutaran group
- Tongkil-Banguingui (Samales) group
- Siasi-Tapul group

=== Administrative divisions ===
Sulu comprises 19 municipalities that are organized into two legislative districts and further subdivided into 410 barangays.

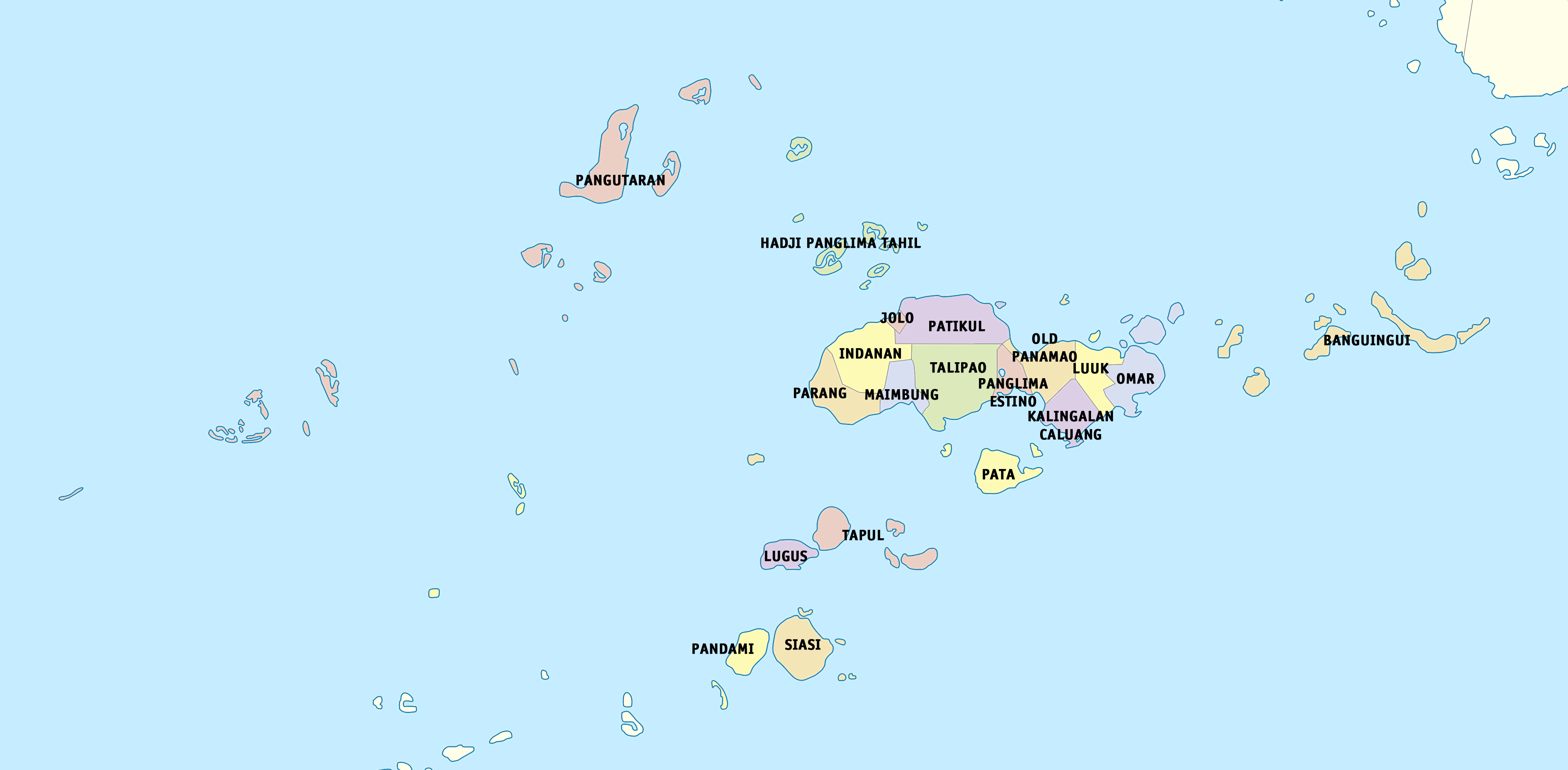
Political map

† Provincial capital

Municipality		District	Population			±% p.a.	Area		Density		Barangay	Coordinates^{[A]}
			(2020)		(2015)		km^{2}	sq mi	/km^{2}	/sq mi		
Banguingui		2nd	3.6%	35,616	24,161	7.67%	352.59	136.14	100	260	14	6°01′32″N 121°50′11″E
Hadji Panglima Tahil		1st	0.8%	7,906	6,375	4.18%	67.90	26.22	120	310	5	6°06′37″N 120°57′58″E
Indanan		1st	9.3%	93,168	80,883	2.73%	170.72	65.92	550	1,400	34	5°58′20″N 120°58′10″E
Jolo	†	1st	13.7%	137,266	125,564	1.71%	126.40	48.80	1,100	2,800	8	6°03′13″N 121°00′01″E
Kalingalan Caluang		2nd	4.0%	39,549	31,567	4.39%	166.50	64.29	240	620	9	5°53′03″N 121°15′48″E
Lugus		2nd	2.9%	29,043	21,897	5.52%	133.04	51.37	220	570	17	5°42′12″N 120°49′11″E
Luuk		2nd	3.8%	37,873	32,162	3.16%	313.04	120.87	120	310	12	5°58′04″N 121°18′47″E
Maimbung		1st	6.0%	59,597	37,914	8.99%	77.50	29.92	770	2,000	27	5°55′51″N 121°01′37″E
Omar		2nd	2.8%	28,070	25,116	2.14%	—	—	—	—	8	6°00′36″N 121°23′01″E
Panamao		2nd	5.0%	49,849	40,998	3.79%	107.57	41.53	460	1,200	31	5°58′48″N 121°13′06″E
Pandami		2nd	3.3%	33,177	25,885	4.84%	170.89	65.98	190	490	16	5°33′02″N 120°48′30″E
Panglima Estino		2nd	3.4%	34,249	28,817	3.34%	125.10	48.30	270	700	12	5°57′25″N 121°11′46″E
Pangutaran		1st	3.6%	36,374	30,613	3.34%	258.10	99.65	140	360	16	6°18′00″N 120°35′01″E
Parang		1st	7.1%	71,495	62,172	2.70%	258.00	99.61	280	730	40	5°54′46″N 120°54′19″E
Pata		2nd	2.5%	24,736	22,163	2.11%	116.99	45.17	210	540	14	5°50′28″N 121°10′55″E
Patikul		1st	8.0%	79,564	62,287	4.77%	330.04	127.43	240	620	30	6°05′19″N 121°06′25″E
Siasi		2nd	8.2%	81,689	67,705	0.01%	192.87	74.47	420	1,100	50	5°32′36″N 120°48′53″E
Talipao		1st	10.0%	100,088	80,255	4.29%	380.57	146.94	260	670	52	5°58′31″N 121°06′29″E
Tapul		2nd	2.1%	20,799	18,197	2.58%	89.17	34.43	230	600	15	5°42′18″N 120°52′53″E
Total^{[B]}				1,000,108	824,731	3.74%	—^{[B]}	—^{[B]}	—^{[B]}	—^{[B]}	410	(see GeoGroup box)
1. Coordinates are sortable by latitude. Italicized entries indicate the generic location. Otherwise, they mark the town center.; 2. Total population density and area (sum of all component municipalities: 3,436.99 km^{2} or 343,699 ha) is inconclusive as it conflicts with the figures given by the Sulu Provincial Government website (1,600.40 km^{2} or 160,040 ha).; 3. Dashes (—) in cells indicate unavailable information.

== Demographics ==
Population census of Sulu
Year	Pop.	±% p.a.
1903	73,914	—
1918	127,977	+3.73%
1939	201,348	+2.18%
1948	182,295	−1.10%
1960	248,304	+2.61%
1970	315,421	+2.42%
1975	240,001	−5.33%
1980	360,588	+8.48%
1990	469,971	+2.69%
1995	536,201	+2.50%
2000	619,668	+3.15%
2007	849,670	+4.45%
2010	718,290	−5.93%
2015	824,731	+2.67%
2020	1,000,108	+4.14%
2024	1,146,097	+3.33%
Source: Philippine Statistics Authority

The population of Sulu in the 2024 census was 1,146,097 people, with a density of 720 inhabitants per square kilometre or 1,900 inhabitants per square mile.

Although consisting of a mixed community of Muslims, the Tausugs dominate the Sulu Archipelago. The Tausug were among the first inhabitants of the Philippines to embrace Islam as a religion and a way of life. They are referred to as 'people of the current', reflective of their close ties to the sea.

=== Religion ===
Tulay Mosque in Jolo

Sulu inhabitants are predominantly Muslim, constituting about 99% of the provincial population in 2015.

A majority of Sulu's Muslim population practice Sunni Islam of the Shafi'i tradition, as taught by Arab, Persian, Indian Muslim, Chinese Muslim and Malaccan missionaries from the 14th Century onwards.

Relatively newer Islamic sects, mostly brought by returning veterans of the Afghan wars and missionaries from Pakistan's stricter Sufi traditions, referred to as the Tableegh, have been active in propagating what they believe to be a "purer" Islamic way of life and worship. A small number who have since married into Iranian or Iraqi families have converted to Shiite Islam.

The majority of Sulu Christians are Catholics. They are under the jurisdiction of Archdiocese of Zamboanga through its suffragan Apostolic Vicariate of Jolo. Non-Catholic Christians include Evangelicals, Jesus Miracle Crusade, Episcopalian, Iglesia ni Cristo (INC), Mormons, Seventh-day Adventists, Jehovah's Witnesses, and a number of other Protestant denominations. Only the most recent Chinese immigrants adhere to Buddhism or Taoism, while most of the older Chinese families have acculturated and have either converted to Christianity or Islam while retaining many of their Chinese beliefs.

=== Languages ===
The Tausug language is the lingua franca of Sulu. The other local language is the indigenous Sama, which is widely used in varied tones and accents. This variety led to the development of Sinama dialects. The major ones are Sinama Sibutu (spoken mainly in the Sibutu-Sitangkai Region), Sinama Simunul (concentrated in Simunul-Manuk-Mangkaw Islands), Sinama Kapoan (spoken in the South Ubian-Tandubas and Sapa-Sapa Regions) and Sinama Banguingui (concentrated in Buan Island and spoken by Banguingui people).

The Bajau-Sama language is also spoken, as are the official languages of Filipino and English. Many locals and barter traders can speak Sabah Malay, while Chavacano is also spoken by Christian and Muslim locals who maintain contacts and trade with the mainland Zamboanga Peninsula and Basilan.

- Tausug
- Pangutaran Sama
- Balangingih Sama
- Yakan
- Southern Sama
- Central Sama
- Mapun
- Ibatag
- Central Subanen
- Western Subanon
- Kolibugan Subanen

== Government ==
Governors after People Power Revolution 1986:

- 1986 - 1989: Habib Loong
- 1989 - 1992: Habib Loong
- 1992 - 1995: Habib Loong
- 1996 : Sayyid Al-Hassan Caluang
- 1996 - 1998: Abdusakur Mahail Tan
- 1998 - 2001: Abdusakur Tan
- 2001 - 2004: Yusop Jikiri
- 2004 - 2007: Benjamin Loong
- 2007 - 2010: Abdusakur Tan
- 2010 - 2013: Abdusakur Tan
- 2013 - 2016: Abdusakur Tan II
- 2016 - 2019: Abdusakur Tan II
- 2019 - 2025: Abdusakur Tan
- 2025 - present: Abdusakur Tan II

Vice Governors after People Power Revolution 1986:

- 1986 - 1989,
- 1989 - 1992: Kimar Tulawie
- 1992 - 1995:
- 1995 - 1998,
- 1998 - 2001: Munib Estino
- 2001 - 2004: Abdel Anni
- 2004 - 2007: Nur-Ana Sahidulla
- 2007 - 2010: Nur-Ana Sahidulla
- 2010 - 2013: Benjamin Loong
- 2013 - 2016: Abdusakur Tan
- 2016 - 2019: Nurunisah Tan
- 2019 - 2025: Abdusakur Tan II
- 2025 - present: Abdusakur Tan

== Economy ==
Poverty incidence of Sulu (%)

Source: Philippine Statistics Authority

Sulu is predominantly agricultural with farming and fishing as its main livelihood activities. Its fertile soil and ideal climate can grow a variety of crops such as abaca, coconuts, Sulu coffee, oranges, and lanzones as well as exotic fruits seldom found elsewhere in the country such as durian and mangosteen.

Fishing is the most important industry since the Sulu Sea is one of the richest fishing grounds in the country. The province also has an extensive pearl industry, with a pearl farm on Marungas Island. The backs of sea turtles are made into beautiful trays and combs. During breaks from fishing, the people build boats and weave mats. Other industries include coffee processing and fruit preservation.

The handicrafts of Sulu have both Islamic and Malay influences. Skilled artisans make boats, bladed weapons, bronze and brassware, pis cloth, embroidered textiles, shellcraft, traditional house carvings, and carved wooden grave markers.

The province used to be one of the most prosperous in the southern Philippines. However, due to conflicts, terrorism, and the establishment of jihadists groups following Wahhabism such as the Abu Sayyaf, the province's economy has suffered badly and has been reduced to its current state.

== Transportation ==
The province is home to Jolo Airport.

== Notable people ==
- Hadji Butu – Filipino statesman, first Muslim member of the Senate of the Philippines.
- Santanina Rasul – Filipina politician and the first Muslim woman member of the Senate of the Philippines.
- Antonio Kho Jr. – 193rd Associate Justice of the Supreme Court of the Philippines
- Abdulmari Imao – National Artist of the Philippines for Visual Arts – Sculpture
- Leonor Orosa-Goquingco – National Artist of the Philippines for Dance
- Samuel K. Tan – historian and former chairperson of National Historical Commission of the Philippines
- Kerima Polotan Tuvera – fiction writer, essayist, and journalist
- Tuburan Tamse – swimmer and the first Muslim Filipino Olympian
- Princess Tarhata Kiram – Moro leader
- Mohammed Esmail Kiram I – Sultan of Sulu from 1950 to 1974
- Mohammed Mahakuttah Abdullah Kiram – last Sultan of Sulu officially recognized by Philippine government
- Jamalul Kiram III – self-proclaimed Sultan of Sulu
- Nur Misuari - leader of the Moro National Liberation Front
- Muedzul Lail Tan Kiram – crown prince of Sultan Mahakuttah Kiram and current head of the Royal house of Sulu. Sunni, Ash'ari in Aqeeda and Shafi'i in Madh'hab, leader.

== See also ==
- Bangsamoro
- Moro people
- Islam in the Philippines
- Moro Islamic Liberation Front
- Sultanate of Sulu
- Moro National Liberation Front
- Battle of Jolo (1974)
