= Lugus, Sulu =

Municipality in Sulu, Philippines

Lugus لُݢُسْ
- Municipality
- Municipality of Lugus
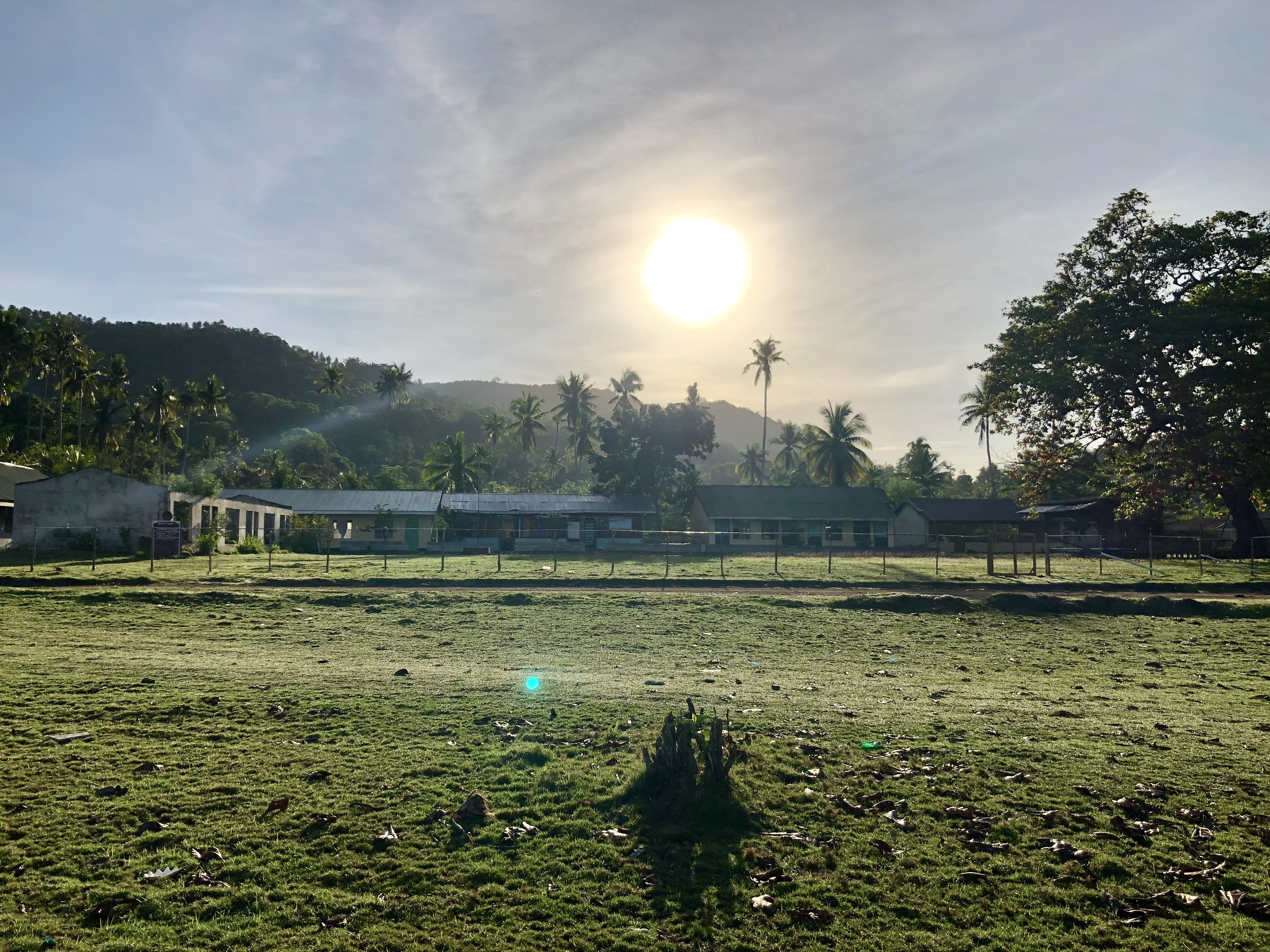
- Mangkallay Elementary School at sunrise

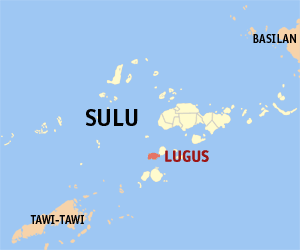
- Map of Sulu with Lugus highlighted
- Interactive map of Lugus
- Location within the Philippines
- Coordinates: 5°42′N 120°49′E
- Country: Philippines
- Region: Zamboanga Peninsula
- Province: Sulu
- District: 2nd district
- Barangays: 17 (see Barangays)

Government
  - Type: Sangguniang Bayan
  - Mayor: Hadar M. Hajiri, Al-haj.
  - Vice Mayor: Almedzar A. Hajiri
  - Representative: Munir N. Arbison Jr.
  - Municipal Council: Members: Shermahal A. Hajiri; Galib A. Juljani; Alvarez A. Ahamad; Limtajar B. Hassan; Dhoh D. Wahab; Sam K. Kalbi; Shelma S. Askalani; Radzmil S. Julkipli
  - Electorate: 19,470 voters (2025)

Area
  - Total: 133.04 km^{2} (51.37 sq mi)
- Elevation: 8.0 m (26.2 ft)
- Highest elevation: 487 m (1,598 ft)
- Lowest elevation: 0 m (0 ft)

Population (2024 census)
  - Total: 35,412
  - Density: 266.18/km^{2} (689.39/sq mi)
  - Households: 5,044

Economy
  - Income class: 4th municipal income class
  - Poverty incidence: 18.18% (2023)
  - Revenue: ₱ 141.8 million (2022)
  - Assets: ₱ 207.3 million (2022)
  - Expenditure: ₱ 79.74 million (2022)
  - Liabilities: ₱ 49.04 million (2022)

Service provider
  - Electricity: Sulu Electric Cooperative (SULECO)
- Time zone: UTC+8 (PST)
- ZIP code: 7411
- PSGC: 1906617000
- IDD : area code: +63 (0)68
- Native languages: Tausug; Tagalog
- Website: www.lugus.gov.ph

Lugus, officially the Municipality of Lugus (Tausūg: Kawman sin Lugus; Filipino: Bayan ng Lugus), is a municipality in the province of Sulu, Philippines. According to the 2024 census, it has a population of 35,412 people.

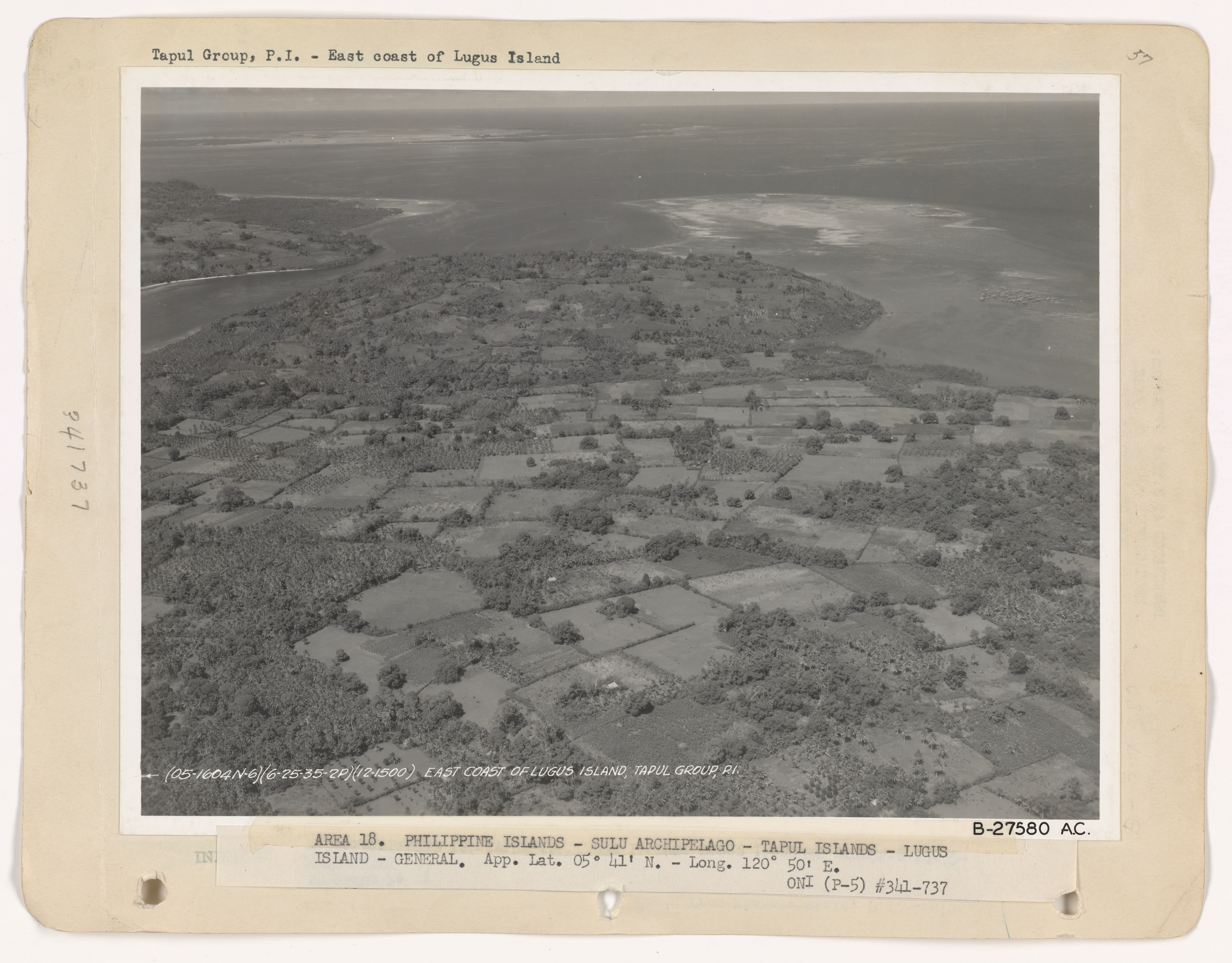
Aerial view of Lugus Island east coast, date unknown

== Geography ==
=== Barangays ===
Lugus is politically subdivided into 17 barangays. Each barangay consists of puroks while some have sitios.

- Alu Bus-Bus
- Alu-Duyong
- Bas Lugus
- Gapas Rugasan
- Gapas Tubig Tuwak
- Huwit-huwit Bas Nonok
- Huwit-huwit Proper
- Kutah Parang
- Laha
- Larap
- Lugus Proper
- Bas Mangkallay
- Mantan
- Pait
- Parian Kayawan
- Sibul
- Tingkangan

=== Climate ===
Climate data for Lugus, Sulu
Month	Jan	Feb	Mar	Apr	May	Jun	Jul	Aug	Sep	Oct	Nov	Dec	Year
Mean daily maximum °C (°F)	27 (81)	27 (81)	27 (81)	28 (82)	29 (84)	28 (82)	28 (82)	28 (82)	28 (82)	28 (82)	28 (82)	28 (82)	28 (82)
Mean daily minimum °C (°F)	27 (81)	26 (79)	27 (81)	27 (81)	28 (82)	28 (82)	28 (82)	28 (82)	28 (82)	28 (82)	28 (82)	27 (81)	28 (81)
Average precipitation mm (inches)	184 (7.2)	143 (5.6)	144 (5.7)	136 (5.4)	240 (9.4)	301 (11.9)	272 (10.7)	253 (10.0)	183 (7.2)	265 (10.4)	246 (9.7)	208 (8.2)	2,575 (101.4)
Average rainy days	18.6	15.8	16.9	15.7	23.3	24.2	24.6	23.2	20.5	23.0	22.2	20.4	248.4
Source: Meteoblue (modeled/calculated data, not measured locally)

== Demographics ==
Population census of Lugus
Year	Pop.	±% p.a.
1990	14,907	—
1995	16,330	+1.72%
2000	18,839	+3.11%
2007	21,650	+1.94%
2010	19,839	−3.13%
2015	21,897	+1.90%
2020	29,043	+6.12%
2024	35,412	+4.88%
Source: Philippine Statistics Authority

== Economy ==
Poverty Incidence of Lugus

Source: Philippine Statistics Authority
