= Tapul =

Municipality in Sulu, Philippines

Tapul تَفُلْ
- Municipality
- Municipality of Tapul
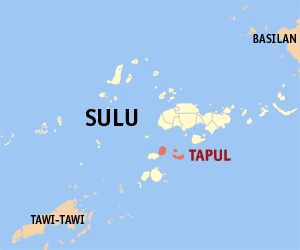
- Map of Sulu with Tapul highlighted
- Interactive map of Tapul
- Location within the Philippines
- Coordinates: 5°42′17″N 120°52′54″E
- Country: Philippines
- Region: Zamboanga Peninsula
- Province: Sulu
- District: 2nd district
- Barangays: 15 (see Barangays)

Government
  - Type: Sangguniang Bayan
  - Mayor: Nasser T. Daud Jr.
  - Vice Mayor: Dornie T. Daud
  - Representative: Munir N. Arbison Jr.
  - Municipal Council: Members: Abdulmalik H. Manajil; Jurbarri H. Daud; Jaafar H. Jupurie; Elma A. Haradji; Bahsi T. Manajil; Bajer B. Ingilan; Jurry H. Sayyadi; Alfarzie J. Idjal
  - Electorate: 15,614 voters (2025)

Area
  - Total: 89.17 km^{2} (34.43 sq mi)
- Elevation: 10 m (33 ft)
- Highest elevation: 487 m (1,598 ft)
- Lowest elevation: 0 m (0 ft)

Population (2024 census)
  - Total: 21,830
  - Density: 244.8/km^{2} (634.1/sq mi)
  - Households: 3,617

Economy
  - Income class: 4th municipal income class
  - Poverty incidence: 22.74% (2023)
  - Revenue: ₱ 132.1 million (2022)
  - Assets: ₱ 116 million (2022)
  - Expenditure: ₱ 105.5 million (2022)
  - Liabilities: ₱ 23.1 million (2022)

Service provider
  - Electricity: Sulu Electric Cooperative (SULECO)
- Time zone: UTC+8 (PST)
- ZIP code: 7410
- PSGC: 1906614000
- IDD : area code: +63 (0)68
- Native languages: Tausug; Tagalog
- Website: www.tapul.gov.ph

Tapul, officially the Municipality of Tapul (Tausūg: Kawman sin Tapul; Tagalog: Bayan ng Tapul), is a municipality in the province of Sulu, Philippines. According to the 2024 census, it has a population of 21,830 people.

== Geography ==
=== Barangays ===
Tapul is politically subdivided into 15 barangays. Each barangay consists of puroks while some have sitios.

- Alu-Kabingaan
- Banting
- Hawan
- Kalang (Poblacion)
- Kamaunggi
- Kanaway
- Kanmangon
- Kaumpang
- Pagatpat
- Pangdan
- Puok
- Sayli
- Sumambat
- Tangkapaan
- Tulakan

=== Climate ===
Climate data for Tapul, Sulu
Month	Jan	Feb	Mar	Apr	May	Jun	Jul	Aug	Sep	Oct	Nov	Dec	Year
Mean daily maximum °C (°F)	27 (81)	27 (81)	28 (82)	28 (82)	29 (84)	29 (84)	28 (82)	28 (82)	28 (82)	28 (82)	28 (82)	28 (82)	28 (82)
Mean daily minimum °C (°F)	27 (81)	27 (81)	27 (81)	27 (81)	28 (82)	28 (82)	28 (82)	28 (82)	28 (82)	28 (82)	28 (82)	27 (81)	28 (82)
Average precipitation mm (inches)	184 (7.2)	143 (5.6)	144 (5.7)	136 (5.4)	240 (9.4)	301 (11.9)	272 (10.7)	253 (10.0)	183 (7.2)	265 (10.4)	246 (9.7)	208 (8.2)	2,575 (101.4)
Average rainy days	18.6	15.8	16.9	15.7	23.3	24.2	24.6	23.2	20.5	23.0	22.2	20.4	248.4
Source: Meteoblue (modeled/calculated data, not measured locally)

== Demographics ==
Population census of Tapul
Year	Pop.	±% p.a.
1903	7,440	—
1918	7,358	−0.07%
1939	18,496	+4.49%
1948	16,601	−1.19%
1960	18,577	+0.94%
1970	20,694	+1.08%
1975	28,340	+6.51%
1980	23,472	−3.70%
1990	10,111	−8.08%
1995	12,392	+3.89%
2000	14,881	+4.00%
2007	17,430	+2.20%
2010	16,370	−2.26%
2015	18,197	+2.04%
2020	20,799	+2.85%
2024	21,830	+1.17%
Source: Philippine Statistics Authority

== Economy ==
Poverty Incidence of Tapul

Source: Philippine Statistics Authority
