= Banguingui, Sulu =

Municipality in Sulu, Philippines

Banguingui بَڠِڠِ Tongkil
- Municipality
- Municipality of Banguingui
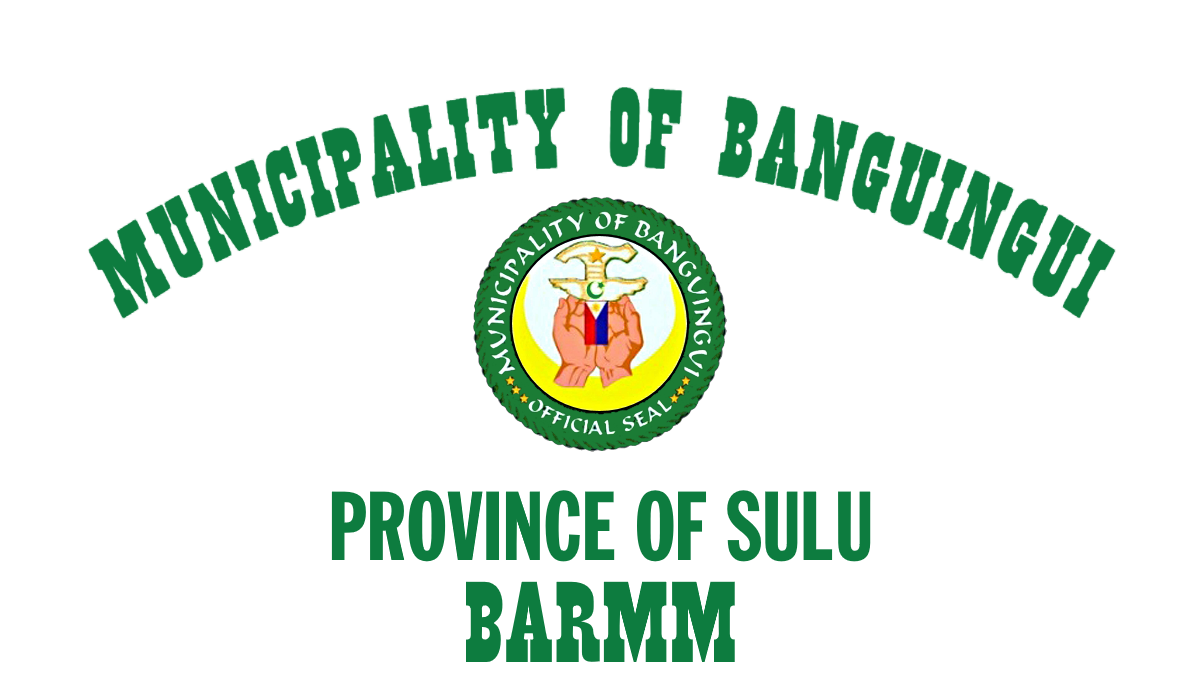
- Flag Seal

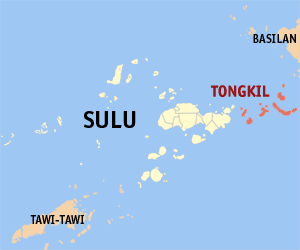
- Map of Sulu with Banguingui highlighted
- Interactive map of Banguingui
- Location within the Philippines
- Coordinates: 6°04′N 121°47′E
- Country: Philippines
- Region: Zamboanga Peninsula
- Province: Sulu
- District: 2nd district
- Barangays: 14 (see Barangays)

Government
  - Type: Sangguniang Bayan
  - Mayor: Whidzfar I. Sahidulla
  - Vice Mayor: Denrasher A. Abdilla
  - Representative: Munir N. Arbison Jr.
  - Municipal Council: Members: Whajid I. Sahidulla; Alnacquer I. Sahidulla; Abdul Haber S. Alih; Amiril P. Sahidulla; Sadik A. Kurais; Malik A. Sariul; Hja Kerma A. Agga; Maldisan A. Anni
  - Electorate: 12,767 voters (2025)

Area
  - Total: 352.59 km^{2} (136.14 sq mi)
- Elevation: 3.0 m (9.8 ft)
- Highest elevation: 386 m (1,266 ft)
- Lowest elevation: 0 m (0 ft)

Population (2024 census)
  - Total: 39,202
  - Density: 111.18/km^{2} (287.96/sq mi)
  - Households: 6,226

Economy
  - Income class: 2nd municipal income class
  - Poverty incidence: 17.07% (2023)
  - Revenue: ₱ 212.5 million (2022)
  - Assets: ₱ 622.9 million (2022)
  - Expenditure: ₱ 164 million (2022)
  - Liabilities: ₱ 196.9 million (2022)

Service provider
  - Electricity: Sulu Electric Cooperative (SULECO)
- Time zone: UTC+8 (PST)
- ZIP code: 7406
- PSGC: 1906615000
- IDD : area code: +63 (0)68
- Native languages: Tausug; Tagalog
- Website: www.tongkil.gov.ph

Municipality of Banguingui (Sinama: Lahat Banguingui; Tausūg: Kawman sin Banguingui; Tagalog: Bayan ng Banguingui) is a municipality in the province of Sulu, Philippines. According to the 2024 census, it has a population of 39,202 people.

From its original name Tongkil, it was renamed Banguingui on January 29, 1999, by virtue of Muslim Mindanao Autonomy Act No. 71 of the Autonomous Region in Muslim Mindanao in honor of the dominant Banguingui tribe of the municipality. It was inaugurated only on January 29, 2006.

== Geography ==
=== Barangays ===
Tongkil is politically subdivided into 14 barangays. Each barangay consists of puroks while some have sitios.

- Bakkaan
- Bangalaw
- Danao
- Dungon
- Kahikukuk
- Luuk (Poblacion)
- North Paarol
- Sigumbal
- South Paarol
- Tabialan
- Tainga-Bakkao
- Tambun-bun
- Tattalan
- Tinutungan

=== Climate ===
Climate data for Banguingui, Sulu
Month	Jan	Feb	Mar	Apr	May	Jun	Jul	Aug	Sep	Oct	Nov	Dec	Year
Mean daily maximum °C (°F)	28 (82)	27 (81)	28 (82)	28 (82)	28 (82)	28 (82)	28 (82)	28 (82)	28 (82)	28 (82)	28 (82)	28 (82)	28 (82)
Mean daily minimum °C (°F)	27 (81)	27 (81)	27 (81)	27 (81)	28 (82)	28 (82)	28 (82)	28 (82)	28 (82)	28 (82)	28 (82)	27 (81)	28 (82)
Average precipitation mm (inches)	148 (5.8)	110 (4.3)	116 (4.6)	127 (5.0)	241 (9.5)	318 (12.5)	304 (12.0)	281 (11.1)	202 (8.0)	262 (10.3)	227 (8.9)	164 (6.5)	2,500 (98.5)
Average rainy days	17.0	14.6	15.5	15.8	23.3	24.4	24.8	24.0	20.2	22.5	21.0	18.7	241.8
Source: Meteoblue (modeled/calculated data, not measured locally)

== Demographics ==
Population census of Banguingui
Year	Pop.	±% p.a.
1903	1,000	—
1918	8,212	+15.07%
1939	2,893	−4.85%
1948	3,673	+2.69%
1960	5,816	+3.90%
1970	9,095	+4.57%
1975	14,062	+9.13%
1980	15,716	+2.25%
1990	10,469	−3.98%
1995	12,971	+4.10%
2000	15,933	+4.51%
2007	22,502	+4.88%
2010	17,802	−8.17%
2015	24,161	+5.99%
2020	35,616	+8.51%
2024	39,202	+2.33%
Source: Philippine Statistics Authority

== Economy ==
Poverty Incidence of Banguingui

Source: Philippine Statistics Authority
