= Lupah Sug =

Predecessor state of the Sultanate of Sulu (12th century c.e. –1405 c.e.)

Coordinates: 6°03′07″N 121°00′07″E

Lupah Sug: سوݢ
- before 1280–1405
- Capital: Seat of power is based at Maimbung, Jolo, Sulu Strait
- Common languages: Old Tausug, Bajau, other Visayan languages, Banguingui and Old Malay
- Religion: Indigenous religion, syncretistically adapting elements from Hinduism and Buddhism. (see also Polytheism)
- Government: Precolonial barangay
- Rajahnate
  - before 1280 CE: Rajah Sipad the Older (first)
  - 1390–1405: Rajah Baguinda
  - 1405: Sultan Sharif ul-Hashim
- History
  - The Principality of Maimbung, populated by Buranun people, was first ruled by Rajah Sipad the Older: before 1280
  - Establishment of Sultanate of Sulu: 1405
- Currency: Barter
Preceded by	Succeeded by
Precolonial barangay; Prehistory of the Philippines	Sultanate of Sulu
- Today part of: Philippines

In the Philippine history, the Lupah Sug (Jawi:سوݢ) was a predecessor state before the establishment of Sultanate of Sulu.

== History ==
=== Hindu principality of Maimbung ===
Sulu that time was called Lupah Sug and ruled by the Indianised Hindu principality of Maimbung, populated by Buranun people (or Budanon, literally means "mountain-dwellers"), was first ruled by a certain rajah who assumed the title Rajah Sipad the Older. According to Majul, the origins of the title rajah sipad originated from the Hindu sri pada, which symbolises authority. The Principality was instituted and governed using the system of rajahs. Sipad the Older was succeeded by Sipad the Younger.

=== Pre-Islamic social structure of the Hindu principality ===
Prior to the establishment of the sultanate, the Tausug lived in communities called a banwa. Each banwa was headed by a leader known as a panglima along with a healer called a mangungubat. The panglima was usually a man with a strong political and physical leadership among the community. A healer could be either a man and woman, and they specialized in contacting the spiritual realm. The healers were also exempted from practicing traditional marriage as they frequently had sensual relationships with the same sex, a common trait in numerous tribes throughout the Philippines archipelago and northern Borneo in pre-Islamic and pre-Christian times. Each banwa was considered an independent state, the same with the city-states of other regions in Asia. The Tausug during the era had trade relations with other neighboring Tausug banwas, the Digap of Malay, the Yakan of Basilan, and the nomadic Sama-Bajau.

=== Customs of people up to the arrival of Tuan Mashā′ikha ===
During the reign of Sipad the Younger, a mystic named Tuan Mashā′ikha (Note: Mashā′ikha is an Arabic term which originated from mashā′ikh, which means "an intelligent or pious man".) arrived in Jolo in 1280 AD. (Note: The generally accepted date for the coming of Tuan Mashā′ikha is 1280 AD, however, other Muslim scholars dated his coming only by second half of the 13th century".) Little is known of the origins and early biography of Tuan Mashā′ikha, except that he was a Muslim "who came from foreign lands" at the head of a fleet of Muslim traders, or he was brought into being from a stalk of bamboo and was considered a prophet, thus well respected by the people. Other reports, however, insisted that Tuan Mashā′ikha together with his parents, Jamiyun Kulisa and Indra Suga, were sent to Sulu by Alexander the Great (who is known as Iskandar Zulkarnain in Malay Annals). However, Saleeby dismisses this claim by concluding that Jamiyun Kulisa and Indra Suga were mythical names. According to tarsila, during the coming of Tuan Mashā′ikha, the people of Maimbung worshipped tombs and stones of any kind. After he preached Islam in the area, he married Sipad the Younger's daughter, Idda Indira Suga and bore three children: Tuan Hakim, Tuan Pam and 'Aisha. Tuan Hakim, in turn, begot five children. From the genealogy of Tuan Mashā′ikha, another titular system of aristocracy called "tuanship" started in Sulu. Apart from the Idda Indira Suga, Tuan Mashā′ikha also married into another "unidentified woman" and begot Moumin. Tuan Mashā′ikha died in 710 A.H. (equivalent to 1310 AD), and was buried in Bud Dato near Jolo, with an inscription of Tuan Maqbālū.

=== Majapahit invasion and rebellion ===
A descendant of Tuan Mashā′ikha named Tuan May also begot a son named Datu Tka. The descendants of Tuan May did not assume the title tuan, instead, they started to use datu. It is the first time datu was used as a political institution. During the coming of Tuan Mashā′ikha, the Tagimaha people (literally means "the party of the people") coming from Basilan and several places in Mindanao, also arrived and settled in Buansa. After the Tagimaha came the Baklaya people (which means "seashore dwellers"), believed to be originated from Sulawesi, and settled in Patikul. After these came the Bajau people (or Samal) from Johor. The Bajau were accidentally driven towards Sulu by a heavy monsoon, some of them to the shores of Brunei and others to Mindanao. The population of Buranun, Tagimaha, and Baklaya in Sulu created three parties with distinct system of government and subjects. In the 1300s the Chinese annals, Nanhai zhi, reported that Brunei invaded or administered the Philippine kingdoms of Butuan, Sulu and Ma-i (Mindoro) which would regain their independence at a later date. According to the Nagarakretagama, the Majapahit Empire under Emperor Hayam Wuruk, invaded Sulu at year 1365. However, in 1369, the Sulus rebelled and regained independence and in vengeance, assaulted the Majapahit Empire and its province Po-ni (Brunei), and had invaded the Northeast Coast of Borneo and thereafter went to the capital, looting it of treasure and gold. In the sacking of Brunei, the Sulus had stolen 2 sacred pearls from the Bruneian king. A fleet from the Majapahit capital succeeded in driving away the Sulus, but Po-ni was left weaker after the attack. Since Chinese historiography later recorded there to be a Maharaja of Sulu, it is assumed that it was unable to be reconquered by Majapahit and it was a rival to that state. By 1390 AD, Rajah Baguinda Ali, a prince of the Pagaruyung Kingdom arrived at Sulu and married into the local nobility. At least in 1417, when Sulu rivaled Majapahit, according to Chinese annals, three kings (or monarchs) ruled three civilized kingdoms in the island. Patuka Pahala (Paduka Batara) ruled the eastern kingdom, he was the most powerful; the west kingdom was ruled by Mahalachi (Maharajah); and the kingdom near the cave (or Cave King) was Paduka Patulapok.The Bajau settlers were distributed among the three kingdoms.

Moumin's descendants, the son of Tuan Mashā′ikha populated Sulu. After some time, a certain Timway Orangkaya Su'il was mentioned by the second page of tarsila, that he received four slaves from Manila as a sign of friendship between the two countries. The descendants of Timway Orangkaya Su'il then inherited the title timway, which means "chief". On tarsila's third page, it accounts the fact that the slaves were the ancestors of the inhabitants in the island to Parang, Lati, Gi'tung, and Lu'uk respectively.

The fourth page then narrates the coming of the Buranun (addressed in the tarsila as "the Maimbung people") Tagimaha, Baklaya, then the drifted Bajau immigrants from Johor. The condition of Sulu before the arrival of Islam can be summarised as such: The island was inhabited by several cultures, and was reigned over by three independent kingdoms ruled by the Buranun, Tagimaha, and Baklaya peoples. Likewise, the socio-political systems of these kingdoms were characterised by several distinct institutions: rajahship, datuship, tuanship and timwayship. The arrival of Tuan Mashā′ikha afterwards established a core Islamic community in the island.

== Establishment of Islamic Sultanate ==
The sultanate was founded on 17 November 1405. (Note: The generally accepted date of the establishment of the sultanate by modern historians is 1457. However, the National Historical Commission of the Philippines list the date as "around 1450", or simply "1450s", due to uncertainty. On the other hand, independent Muslim studies marked the day to a more exact date 17 November 1405 (24th of Jumada al-awwal, 808 AH).) by the Johore-born explorer, Sunni Sufi religious scholar Sharif ul-Hashim. Paduka Mahasari Maulana al Sultan Sharif ul-Hashim became his full regnal name, Sharif-ul Hashim is his abbreviated name. He settled in Buansa, Sulu. After the marriage of Abu Bakr and a local dayang-dayang (princess) Paramisuli, he founded the sultanate. The Sultanate gained its independence from the Bruneian Empire in 1578.

=== Islamisation ===
At the end of the 14th century, an Arab Muslim scholar following the Ash'ari Aqeeda and Shafi'i Fiqh named Karim ul-Makhdum (Note: May be interchange to Karimul Makhdum, Karimal Makdum or Makhdum Karim among others. Makhdum came from the Arabic word makhdūmīn, which means "master".) from Mecca arrived in the Malacca Sultanate. He preached Islam to the people, and thus many citizens, including the ruler of Malacca, converted to Islam. Chinese Muslims, Arabs, Persians, Malays, and Indian Muslims introduced Sulu and other Muslim sultanates to Islam. Chinese Muslim merchants participated in the local commerce, and the Sultanate had diplomatic relations with China during the time of the Ming dynasty (1368–1644), being involved in the tribute system. The Sulu leader Paduka Pahala and his sons moved to China, where he died, and Chinese Muslims brought up his sons in Dezhou, where their descendants live and have the surnames An and Wen.

In 1380 AD, (Note: Another uncertain date in Philippine Islamic history is the year of arrival of Karim ul-Makhdum. Though some Muslim sources place the date as simply "the end of 14th century", Saleeby calculated the year as 1380 AD corresponding to the description of the tarsilas, in which Karim ul-Makhdum's coming is 10 years before Rajah Baguinda's. The 1380 reference originated from the event in Islamic history when a huge number of makhdūmīn started to travel to Southeast Asia from India. See Ibrahim's "Readings on Islam in Southeast Asia.") The Sunni Sufi scholar Karim ul-Makhdum arrived in Simunul island from Malacca, again with Arab traders. Apart from being an Islamic preacher, he operated as a trader, some see him as a Sufi missionary originating from Mecca. He preached Islam in the area, and was thus accepted by the core Muslim community. He was the second person who preached Islam in the area, following Tuan Mashā′ikha. To facilitate easy conversion of nonbelievers, he established a mosque in Tubig-Indagan, Simunul, which became the first Islamic temple to be constructed in the area, as well as the first in the Philippines. This later became known as Sheik Karimal Makdum Mosque. He died in Sulu, though the exact location of his grave is unknown. In Buansa, he was known as Tuan Sharif Awliyā. On his alleged grave in Bud Agad, Jolo, an inscription was written as "Mohadum Aminullah Al-Nikad". In Lugus, he is referred to Abdurrahman. In Sibutu, he is known to as his name.

The dispute over the actual location of his grave stemmed from the fact that Karim ul-Makhdum traveled to several islands in Sulu Sea to preach Islam. In many places in the archipelago, he was beloved. It is said that the people of Tapul built a mosque honouring him and that they claim descent from Karim ul-Makhdum. Thus, the success of Karim ul-Makhdum of spreading Islam in Sulu threw a new light in Islamic history in the Philippines. The customs, beliefs and political laws of the people changed and customized to adopt the Islamic tradition.

=== Recorded monarchs ===
title	Ruler	events	From	Until
Rajah	Sipad the Older	His name derived from Sanskrit Sri Pada.	c.1280	
Rajah	Sipad the Younger		1280	1405
Sultan	Sharif ul-Hashim	The founder of the Sulu sultanate, whose proper name was Sayyid walShareef Abu Bakr ibn Abirin AlHashmi. He founded The Royal Sultanate of Sulu in 1457 and renamed himself Paduka Mahasari Maulana al-Sultan Sharif ul-Hashim, which roughly translates from Arabic as "The Master His Majesty, Protector and Sultan, Noble of the Banu Hashim Clan". The Sultan is reported to have lived about thirty years in Buansa, the first seat of the sultanate, and his tomb is located in one of the slopes of nearby Mount Tumantangis	1405	

== See also ==
- Sultanate of Sulu
- Sultanate of Maguindanao
- Confederate States of Lanao
- History of the Philippines (900-1521)
- Islam in the Philippines
