= List of mosques in the Philippines =

This is a list of mosques in the Philippines. Prior to the usage of the common Arabic style merged with modernist style mosque architecture, the vernacular mosques of the Philippines used to be the hut-style and the pagoda-style, which were very common until the late 19th century. Most of the mosques in the Philippines today have common Islamic architectures imported from Arabia, though some vernacular pagoda-style mosques can still be seen in Mindanao such as the Masjid Datu Untong Balabaran of Taviran in Datu Odin Sinsuat, Maguindanao del Norte. There have been proposals to put the Heritage Mosques of the Philippines into the Philippine tentative list for UNESCO World Heritage Site declaration in the future. The proposals made were to input the historic mosques of the Philippines (mosque in Simunul), to input the vernacular mosques of the Philippines (langga/rangga-style and pagoda-style mosques), or to combine both and input them in the tentative list of UNESCO.

== Architectural types ==
Very little is known about the architectural designs of mosque types in the Philippines. This is due to several factors: (1) much of the earliest types of mosques constructed by early missionaries were made of temporary materials like wood, bamboo, and cogon which do not last for years; (2) the remaining earlier types were either demolished, destroyed during earthquakes, or reconstructed/remodelled to suit modern architectural types based on the middle-east designs; (3) the yearly pilgrimage to Mecca radically changed all earliest types; and (4) very little has been written about the subject.

According to the National Commission for Culture and the Arts, the main cultural arm of the Philippine government, it is possible that the sampling of the mosque types in Lanao might represent the “typical” mosques in the Philippines prior to the importation of mosque architecture from Arabia, as Islam was introduced to the Sulu archipelago first, followed by Maguindanao, and then Lanao. Both Sulu and Maguindanao have lost almost all of their non-Arabian style mosque architectural knowledge, making Lanao the last area where such knowledge is still extant, although some pockets still exist in Sulu and Maguindanao. One of the earliest types of mosques in Lanao is a five-tiered building resembling a Chinese pagoda. A variation of this type is a three-tiered or seven-tiered edifice. The earliest mosque in Simunul, Tawi-tawi was initially built through the pagoda-style. Its 4 pillars are still there after more than 400 years. Another example of vernacular mosque in the Philippines is the Masgit sa Buadi Sakayo located, a mosque in Lanao that resembles a Buddhist temple with okir motifs. Other early types of mosques are found in the eastern coasts of Lake Lanao, where some mosques have okir motifs and burak (centaur) depictions some mirrors engraved on the panels of the mosque. Some early type mosques also has inverted jars on top of their domes.

In Lanao, a huge drum called tabo is suspended horizontally inside the mosque and is beaten to call the believers to the mosque. Among the Yakan, a bamboo drum is used for calling people to worship. Inside the mosque, one does not find a pulpit (mimbar) but an elevated platform, a chair or a structure, where the khatib delivers his sermon. Philippine mosques do not have a sahn (courtyard) like those of Middle East mosques. Instead, they have benches outside where people sit and talk while waiting for the next prayer. According to Filipino Muslims, it is not permitted to discuss unIslamic matter inside the mosques.

Overall, the types of mosque architecture in the Philippines can be divided into three, namely:

- Langgal/ranggar - small structures for the faithful, and is usually built in rural areas (like the small chapels in Roman Catholic Christianity), similar to suraus in neighboring Indonesia and Malaysia and musallas in other Muslim countries. These are the oldest form of mosque in the Philippines. The langgal/ranggar-style mosques are still being built and used in Islamic areas in the Philippines, especially in rural areas.
- Pagoda-style Mosque - used by Muslims throughout Islamic areas in the Philippines prior to the importation of the Arabian-style mosque architecture. It is similar to the pagoda-style places of worship in Malaysia and Indonesia, specifically, Bali. The pagoda-style mosques are largely attributed to Hindu and Buddhist pasts of the current Muslim areas in the Philippines. These mosques have eight, five, or three tiers, making them look as if they are pathways to heaven. The pagoda-style mosque building is currently an endangered art form in the Philippines, as most mosques are now built in the Domed/Arabian-style.
- Onion-domed/Arabian-style Mosque - currently the most prominent and widespread style used in building mosques in the Philippines. The Domed/Arabian-style was imported to the Philippines when Filipino Muslims began performing the hajj (pilgrimage to Mecca). On their journey, they saw the mosques of Arabia and copied it, replacing the pagoda-style mosques in the Philippines.

== List ==
Name	Photo	Location		First built	Notes
Name	Photo	City/municipality (Province)	Region	First built	Notes
Al-Dahab Mosque		Manila	Metro Manila	1976	
Baclaran Mosque		Parañaque and Pasay	Metro Manila	1994	
Bagacay Mosque		Dumaguete	Negros Island	2013	
Bataraza Grand Mosque		Bataraza (Palawan)	Mimaropa	2020	
Blue Mosque		Taguig	Metro Manila	1976	
Dansalan Bato Ali Mosque		Marawi	Bangsamoro	1950s	Current building built in 2023 after the mosque was heavily damaged in the Marawi siege of 2017.
Dimaukom Mosque		Datu Saudi Ampatuan (Maguindanao del Sur)	Bangsamoro	2014	
Jailani Mosque		Sibuco (Zamboanga del Norte)	Zamboanga Peninsula	April 9, 2021	
Marawi Grand Mosque (Islamic Center)		Marawi	Bangsamoro	1970	
Oro Jammah Mosque		Cagayan de Oro	Northern Mindanao	1930	
Pagadian Mosque		Pagadian (Zamboanga del Sur)	Zamboanga Peninsula		
Panglima Sugala Grand Mosque		Panglima Sugala (Tawi-Tawi)	Bangsamoro	—N/a	
Sadik Grand Mosque		Zamboanga City	Zamboanga Peninsula	2026 (under-construction)	
Sharief Alawi Islamic Center		Cagayan de Oro	Northern Mindanao	1994	
Sheik Karimol Makdum Mosque		Simunul (Tawi-Tawi)	Bangsamoro	1380	National Historical Landmark
Sittie Maryam Mosque		Cebu City	Central Visayas	2013	
Sultan Haji Hassanal Bolkiah Mosque (Cotabato Grand Mosque)		Cotabato City	Bangsamoro	2011	
Taluksangay Mosque		Zamboanga City	Zamboanga Peninsula	1885	
Tulay Central Mosque		Jolo (Sulu)	Zamboanga Peninsula	1884	

== See also ==
- Islam in the Philippines
- Lists of mosques
- Torogan
