= Pink Mosque =

Pink Mosque may refer to the following Islamic places of worship:

- Dimaukom Mosque in Datu Saudi Ampatuan, Maguindanao, Philippines
- Masjid Putra in Putrajaya, Malaysia
- Nasir-ol-Molk Mosque in Shiraz, Iran
