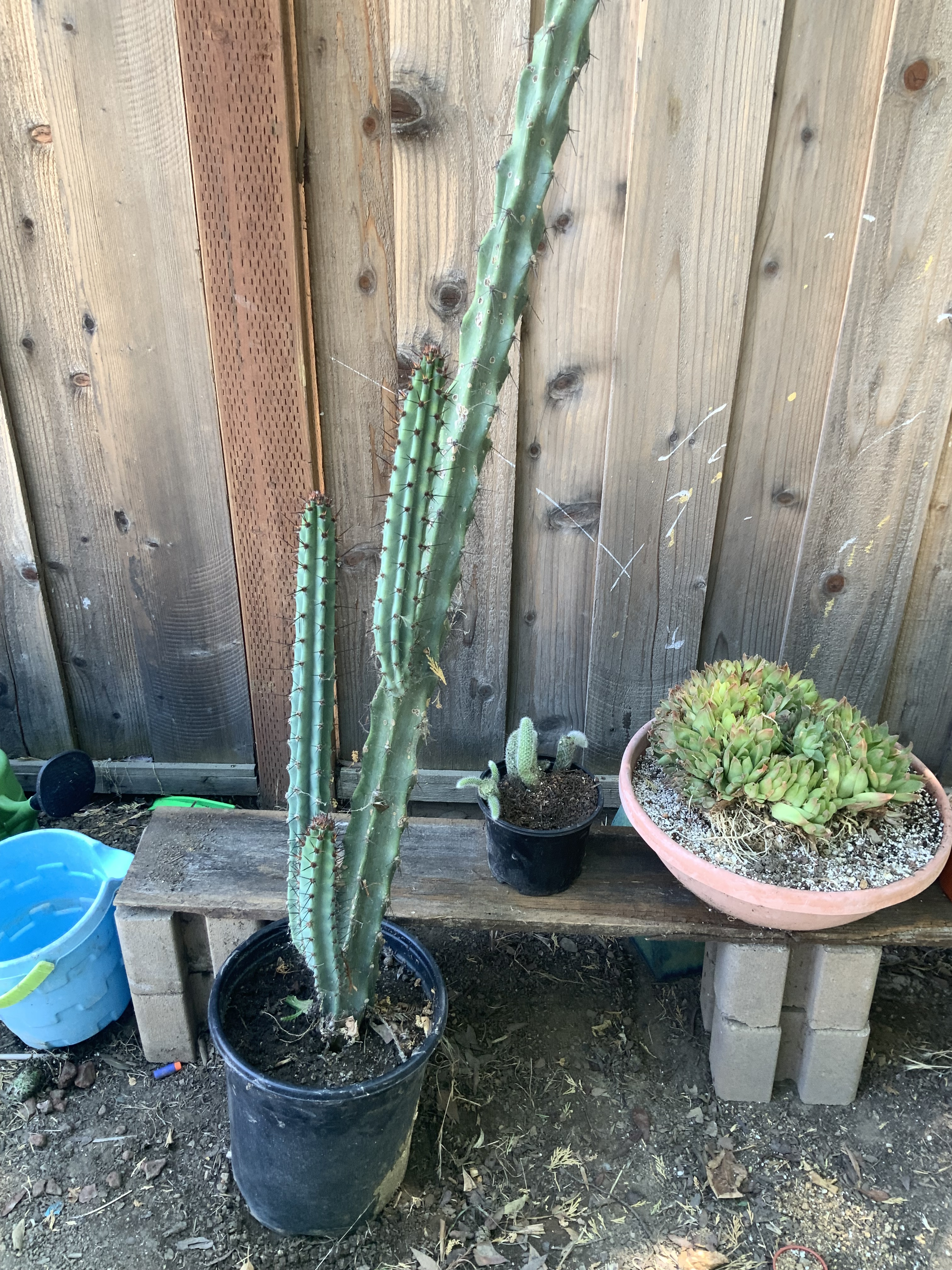

Conservation status
- Least Concern (IUCN 2.3)

Scientific classification
- Kingdom: Plantae
- Clade: Tracheophytes
- Clade: Angiosperms
- Clade: Eudicots
- Order: Caryophyllales
- Family: Cactaceae
- Subfamily: Cactoideae
- Genus: Cereus
- Species: C. aethiops

Binomial name
- Cereus aethiops Haw.

Synonyms
- Cereus aethiops var. landbeckii (Phil.) Backeb.; Cereus aethiops var. melanacanthus (K.Schum.) Backeb.; Cereus azureus J.Parm. ex Pfeiff.; Cereus azureus var. seidelii (Lehm.) Dams; Cereus chalibaeus Salm-Dyck; Cereus chalybaeus Otto; Cereus coerulescens var. landbeckii (Phil.) K.Schum.; Cereus coerulescens var. melanacanthus K.Schum.; Cereus landbeckii Phil. ex Regel; Cereus melanacanthus (K.Schum.) Schelle; Piptanthocereus aethiops (Haw.) F.Ritter; Piptanthocereus azureus (J.Parm. ex Pfeiff.) Riccob.; Piptanthocereus chalibaeus (Salm-Dyck) Riccob.

= Cereus aethiops =

Species of cactus

Cereus aethiops is a species of cactus found from Uruguay to Argentina.

== Description ==
Cereus aethiops grows shrubby, is rarely branched and reaches heights of growth of up to 2 meters. The cylindrical, dark bluish to dark green shoots are upright, occasionally prostrate and have a diameter of 2 to 4 centimeters. There are seven to eight ribs that are divided into humps. The areoles on it are often almost black. The two to four black central spines are up to 2 centimeters long. The nine to twelve radial spines are gray with a darker tip or black. They reach lengths of up to 10 millimeters.

The white to light pink flowers are up to 20 centimeters long. The egg-shaped, red fruits are up to 6 centimeters long.

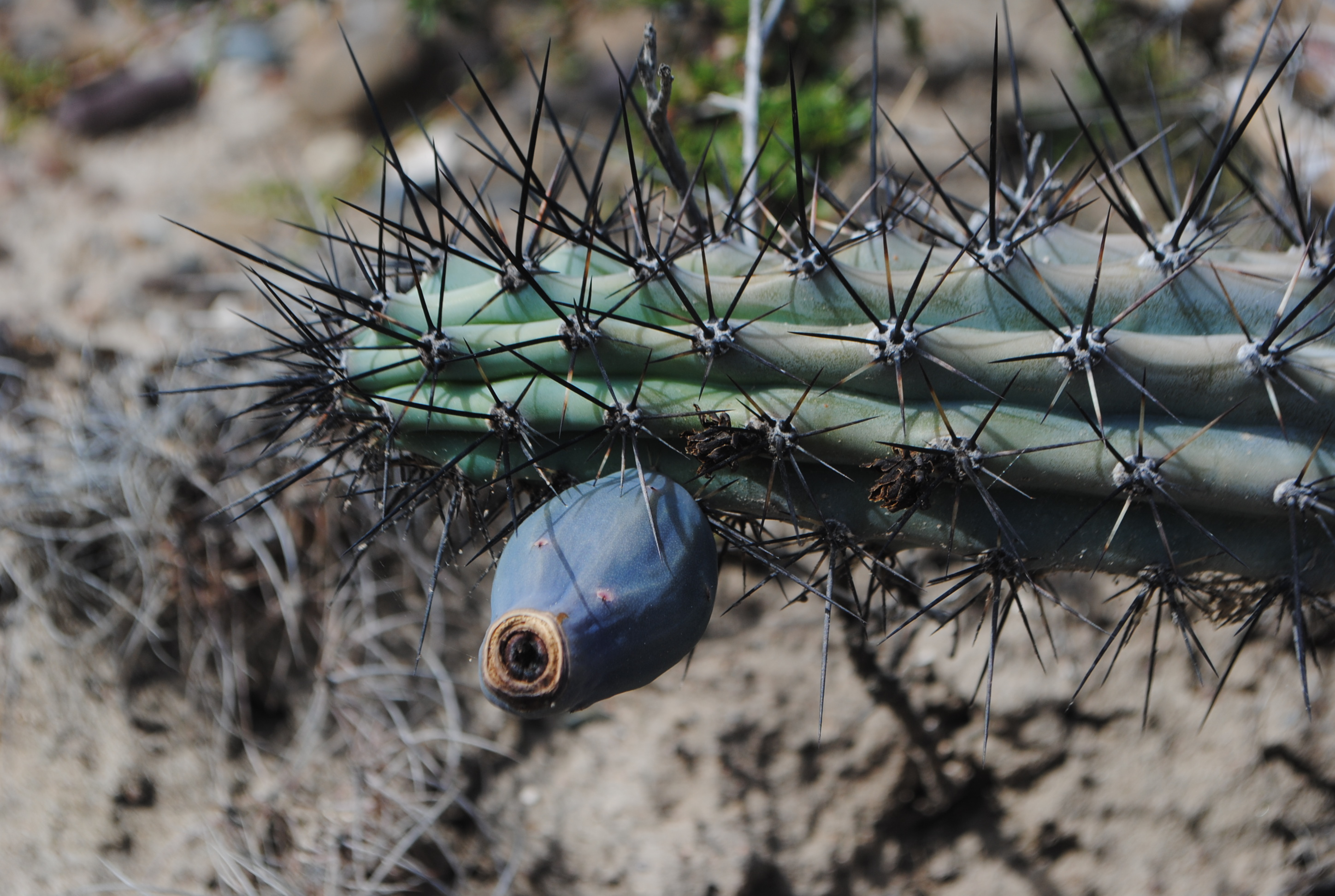
Fruit

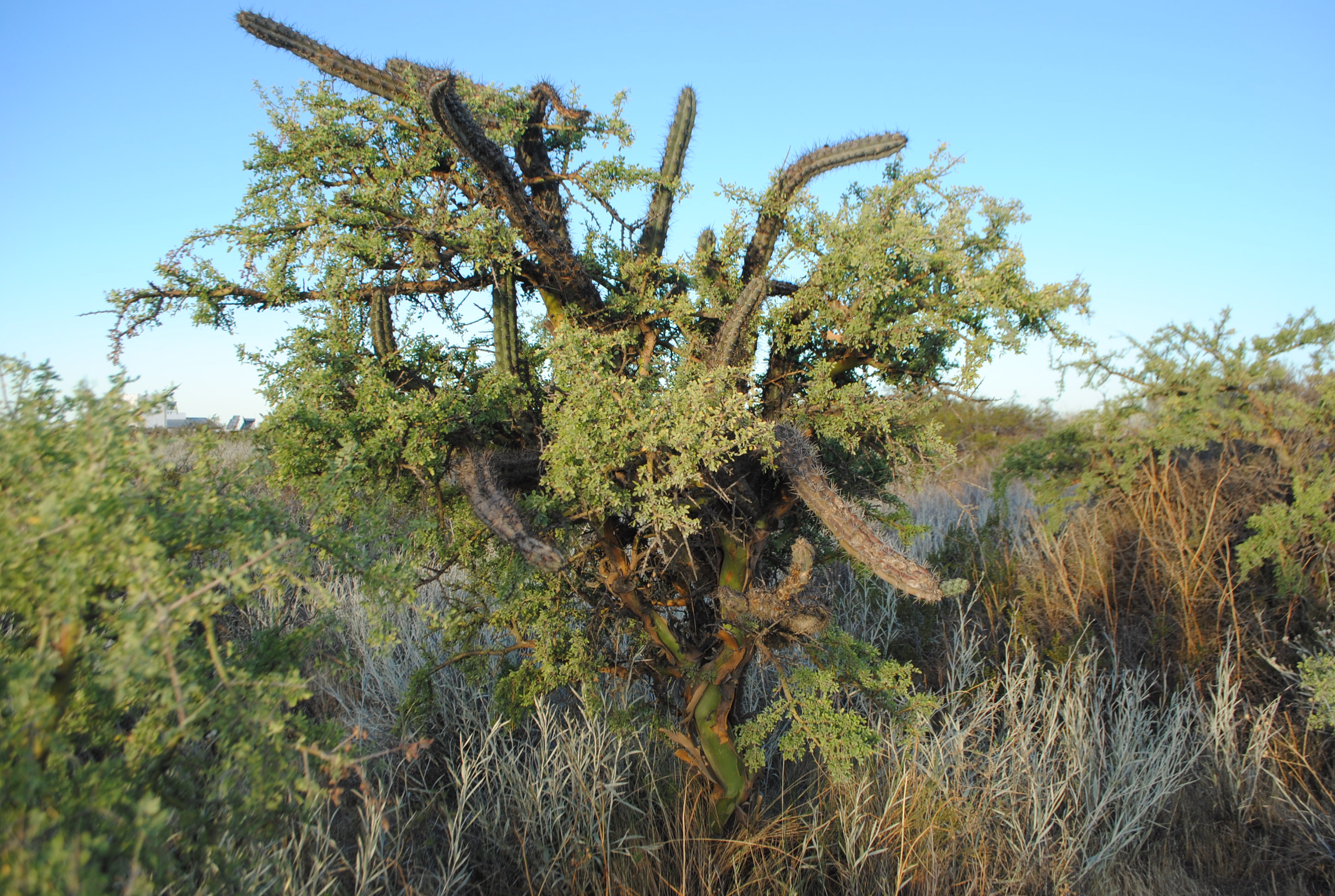
Plant growing in the wild climbing on Geoffroea decorticans at Colonia Cilavert, Las Grutas, Río Negro province, Patagonia, Argentina

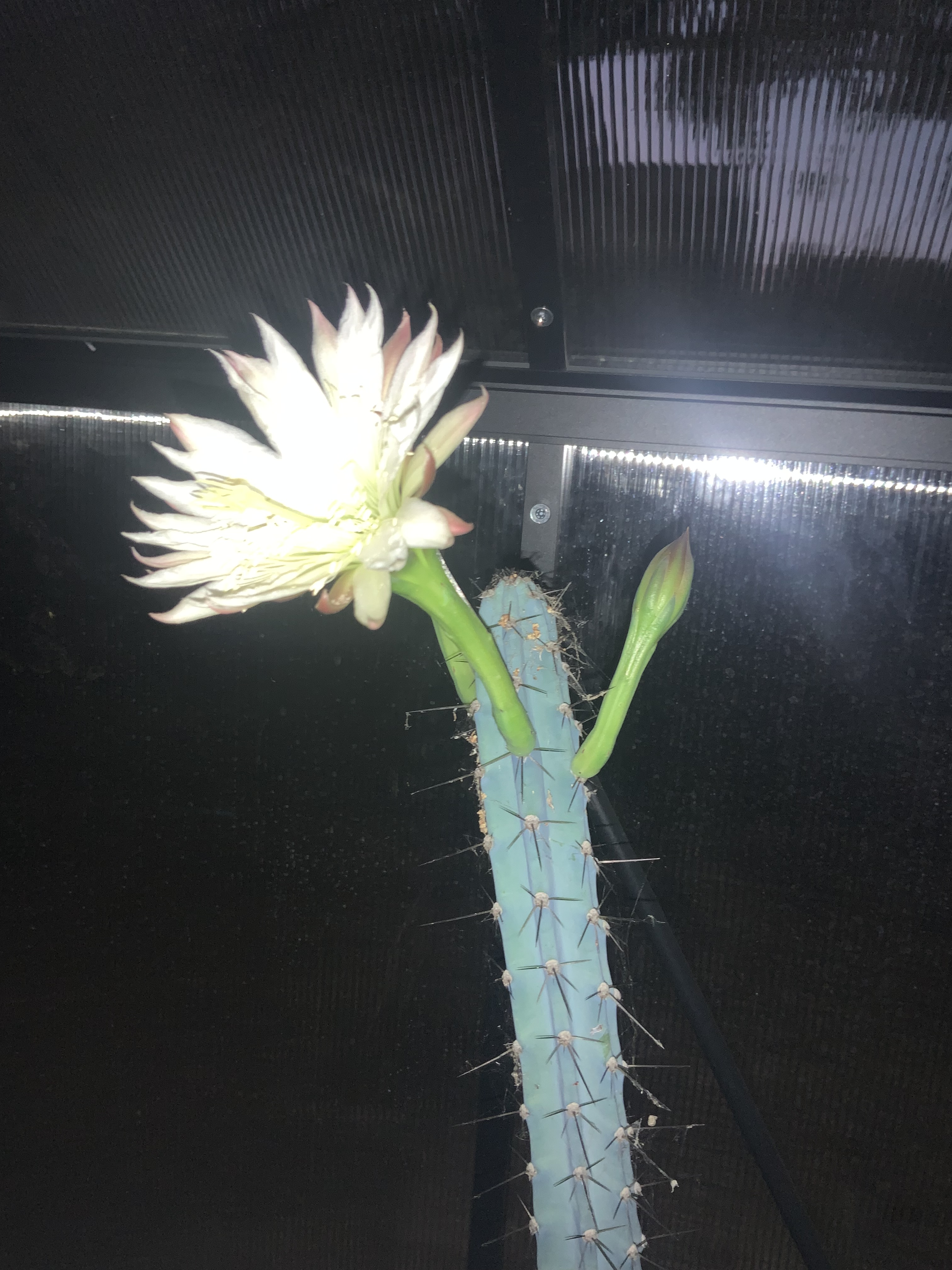
Flower of cereus aethiops

== Cultivation and Propagation ==
Cereus aethiops is slow growing, and mainly kept for the beauty of its flowers. It grows well in the summer and does best in extremely bright situations, which encourages it to flower. Flowers open in the early morning hours and close before the sun comes up.

Cereus aethiops is easy to cultivate, but is prone to root rot if kept in a non-ventilated place, especially after planting. It needs well draining soil, and moderating watering in the hot summer months. Keeping the soil dry in winter helps it survive the colder months. Propagation is easily done via cuttings, Simply sever a branch and replant in moist, well-drained soil.

USDA Hardiness Zones 9a to 11b: from 20 °F (−6.7 °C) to 50 °F (+10 °C).

== Distribution ==
Cereus aethiops is distributed in the foothills of the Andes in northern and central Argentina.

== Taxonomy ==
The first description by Adrian Hardy Haworth was published in 1830. A nomenclatural synonym is Piptanthocereus aethiops (Haw.) F.Ritter (1980).

The IUCN Red List of Threatened Species lists the species as Least Concern (LC)
