= Tulay Central Mosque =

Mosque in Jolo, Sulu, Philippines

- Masjid sin Tulay مَسْجِدْ سِنْ تُلَيْ
- The mosque in 2023

Religion
- Affiliation: Sunni Islam

Location
- Interactive map of Tulay Central Mosque
- Coordinates: 6°03′03.0″N 120°59′53.0″E

Architecture
- Architect: Ampersand Architectural Partnership
- Type: Mosque
- Funded by: Sheikh Zayed Al-Nahayan Foundation
- General contractor: HS Oaminal
- Established: 1884
- Groundbreaking: 2001 (Note: Current mosque buildings's construction was started in 2001. Original structure was destroyed in 1974.)
- Capacity: 5,000

The Tulay Central Mosque (Tausug: Masjid sin Tulay) is a mosque in Jolo, Sulu, Philippines.

== History ==
The original building of the Tulay Central Mosque was built in 1884. As of 1960, the Tulay Mosque was a wooden structure and the largest of its kind in Sulu. However it was destroyed in 1974 during a battle between forces of the Philippine national government and the Moro National Liberation Front.

The present mosque building was built in 2001 and was funded by a donation by the Sheikh Zayed Al-Nahayan Foundation of the United Arab Emirates. The building cost $2 million (₱96 million).

The groundbreaking took place on March 8, 2001, in a ceremony led by Autonomous Region in Muslim Mindanao Governor Nur Misuari.

== Architecture and design ==
Tulay Mosque in 2007

The Tulay Central Mosque was designed by Ampersand Architectural Partnership and the general contractor was HS Oaminal. It can accommodate 5,000 worshippers.

== See Also ==
- Taluksangay Mosque
- List of mosques in the Philippines
- Islam in the Philippines
