= Dimaukom Mosque =

Mosque in Maguindanao del Sur, Philippines

- مسجد ديماوكوم

- Location in Mindanao

Religion
- Affiliation: Islam
- Ecclesiastical or organizational status: Mosque
- Status: Active

Location
- Location: Datu Saudi Ampatuan, Maguindanao del Sur
- Country: Philippines
- Interactive map of Dimaukom Mosque
- Coordinates: 6°55′40″N 124°24′54″E

Architecture
- Type: Mosque architecture
- Completed: 2014

Specifications
- Dome: Many
- Minaret: Two (maybe more)

The Dimaukom Mosque (Arabic: مسجد ديماوكوم, romanized: Masjid Dimaukom), also known as the Pink Mosque, is a mosque in Datu Saudi Ampatuan, Maguindanao del Sur in the Philippines.

== History ==
The mosque's construction was financed by then-Mayor Samsudin Dimaukom. The land where the mosque was built was a property of the mayor's family. The mosque was built by Christian workmen to symbolize unity and inter-faith brotherhood. The mosque first opened during the Ramadan season in 2014.

== Architecture and design ==
The Dimaukom Mosque is notable for its pink painted façade. Pink is meant to symbolize peace and love. According to Mayor Dimaukom, who has used his favorite color pink as his campaign color, says that love is meant to cover various kinds of love including love to Allah and the community. The move to have the mosque painted is also an effort to boost Datu Saudi Ampatuan's local tourism industry having painted or built pink buildings in other parts of the town.

== See also ==
- Islam in the Philippines
- List of mosques in the Philippines
