= Islam in the Philippines =

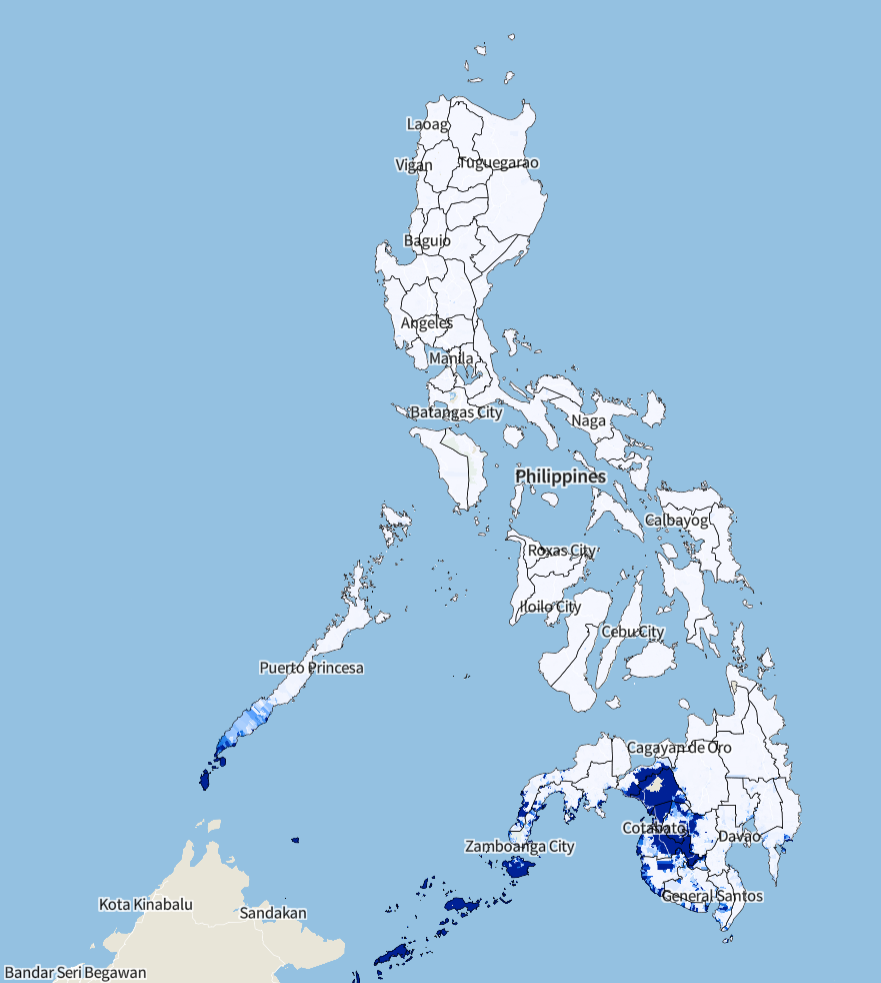
Concentration of Muslims in the Philippines according to the 2020 Philippine Census per barangay level.

Islam in the Philippines is the second largest religion in the country, and the faith was the first-recorded monotheistic religion in the Philippines. Historically, Islam reached the Philippine archipelago in the 14th century, through contact with Muslim Malay and Arab merchants along Southeast Asian trade networks, in addition to Yemeni missionaries from the tribe of Ba 'Alawi sada of Yemen from the Persian Gulf, southern India, and their followers from several sultanates in the wider Malay Archipelago. The first Sunni Sufi missionaries then followed in the late 14th and early 15th centuries. They facilitated the formation of sultanates and conquests in mainland Mindanao and Sulu. Those who converted to Islam came to be known as the Moros, with Muslim conquest reaching as far as Tondo that was later supplanted by Bruneian Empire vassal-state of Maynila.

Muslim sultanates had already begun expanding in the central Philippines by the 16th century, when the Spanish fleet led by Ferdinand Magellan arrived. The Spanish referred to Muslim inhabitants of the Philippines as "Moros," after the Muslim "Moors" they had regarded with disdain in Iberia and the Maghreb. The subsequent Spanish conquest led to Catholic Christianity becoming the predominant religion in most of the modern-day Philippines, with Islam becoming a significant minority religion.

In the 21st century, there is some disagreement regarding the size of the Muslim population. The 2020 census conducted by the Philippine Statistics Authority found that 6.4% (6,981,710) of Filipinos were Muslims, up from 6.0% (6,064,744) in 2015. However, it was reported in 2004 that some Muslim groups asserted that the proper number was between eight and twelve percent. Presently, the National Commission on Muslim Filipinos (NCMF) estimates Muslims constitute 11% of the total population, attributing the difference to a number of factors.

Most Muslims live in parts of Mindanao, Palawan, and the Sulu Archipelago – an area known as Bangsamoro or the Moro region. The Bangsamoro region is predominantly Muslim, with 91% of its 4.9 million inhabitants adhering to Islam. Some have migrated into urban and rural areas in different parts of the country. Most Muslim Filipinos practice Sunni Islam according to the Shafi'i school with a Salafi minority.

== History ==
The Sultan Haji Hassanal Bolkiah Grand Mosque in Cotabato City

From the 9th–13th centuries, Muslim trade networks linking Champa and Sumatra (including Aceh) brought resident traders and scholars to the southern Philippines, especially Taguima (Basilan), where they introduced Islamic practices and teachings.

In the 11th century Muslim traders had strong ties to Butuan in Northeast Mindanao. Butuan would use Muslim traders to lead embassies on their behalf to the Song dynasty, as they had already been doing for the last few decades on behalf of other South East Asian polities like Brunei, Java, Sanfotsi and Champa. In 1003 and 1011, the Song Huiyao Jigao records missions sent by Butuan led by Muslim envoys, with Li Yu xie (李于變), reconstructed as Ali Yusuf, leading the 1011 delegation.

By the 14th century, localized Islamic teaching traditions, later associated in Sulu with figures such as Makhdum Karim, became more visible in the region.

In 1380, the Sunni Shaykh Makhdum Karim reached the Sulu Archipelago and Jolo in the Philippines and established Islam in the country through trade in several regions of the island. In 1390, Minangkabau Prince Rajah Baguinda and his followers preached Islam on the islands. The Sheik Karimol Makhdum Mosque was the first mosque established in the Philippines on Simunul in Mindanao in the 14th century.

Subsequent settlements by Indian Muslim missionaries traveling to Malaysia and Indonesia helped strengthen Islam in the Philippines and each settlement was governed by a datu, rajah and sultan. Islam was introduced by Chinese Muslims, Indian Muslims, and Persians. Islamic provinces founded in the Philippines included the Sunni Sultanate of Maguindanao, Sultanate of Sulu, Confederate States of Lanao and other parts of the southern Philippines.

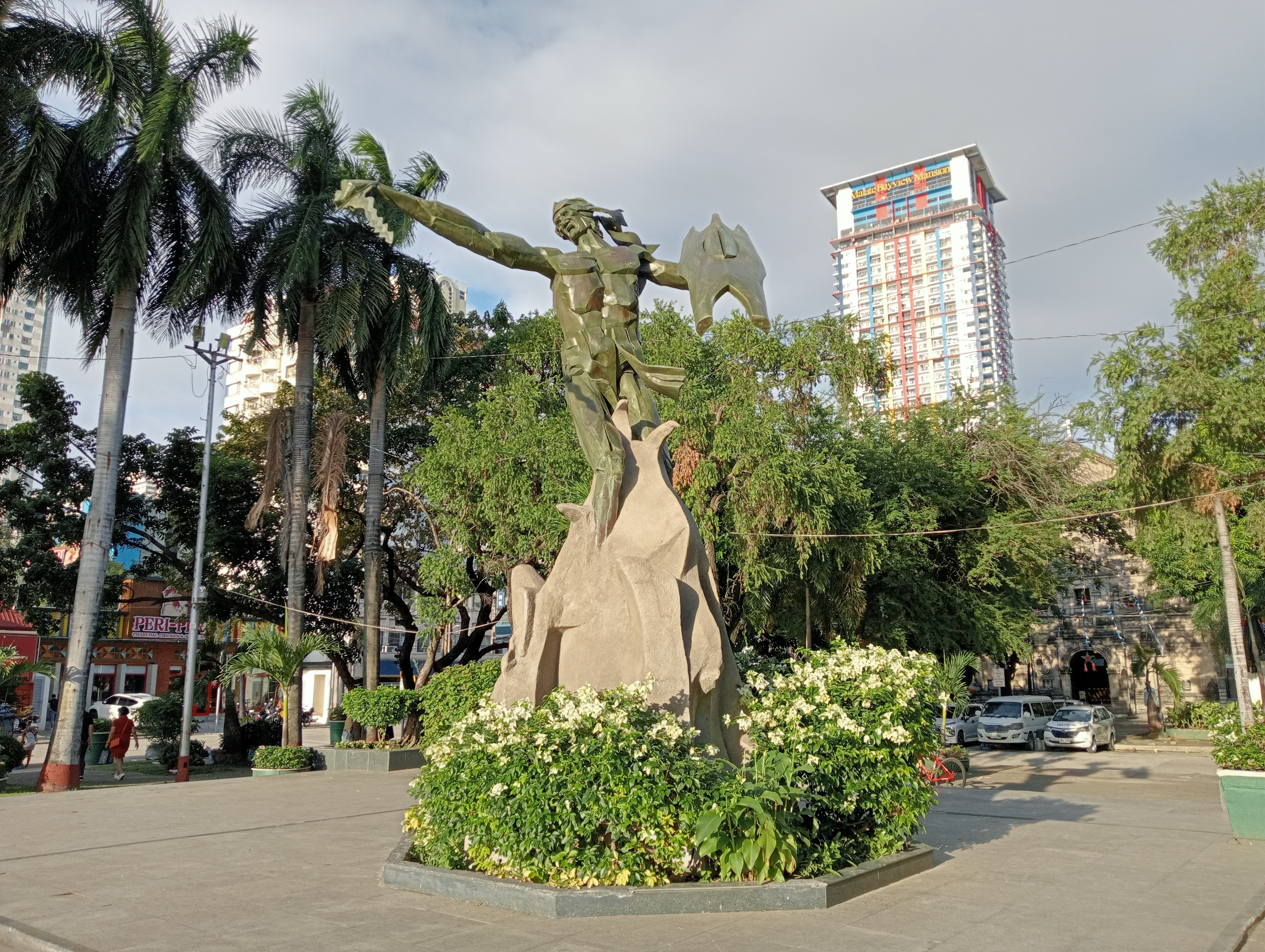
The statue of Rajah Sulayman in Manila, He was the Crown Prince of the Kingdom of Maynila was the commander of the Tagalog forces in the battle of Manila of 1570 against Spanish forces.

When the Spanish fleet led by Miguel López de Legazpi arrived in the Philippines in 1565, they were met by local datus as they traveled in the islands. Arriving in the Maynila (now the Philippine capital of Manila), a vassal-state of the Sultanate of Brunei, in 1570 they were met by the Muslim rajah, Rajah Sulayman.

By the next century conquests had reached the Sulu islands in the southern tip of the Philippines where the population was Buddhist and Hindu and they took up the task of converting the animistic population to Islam with renewed zeal. By the 15th century, half of Luzon (Northern Philippines) and the islands of Mindanao in the south had become subject to the various Muslim sultanates of Borneo and much of the population in the almost of South were converted to Islam. The Visayas consisted of independent coastal communities led by datus and rajahs engaged in trade and regional alliances at the time of Spanish contact. While Indic cultural influences were present, there is no evidence that the region was dominated by formal Hindu-Buddhist states, and the Visayans had little to no contact with Muslims prior to the arrival of the Spanish. Early Spanish accounts, including Relación de las Islas Filipinas and Historia general de las islas occidentales a la Asia adyacentes, identify Sugbu as the native name of Cebu prior to 1565. After 1565, during the Spanish colonial period (1565–1898), the Spanish attacked Muslim communities in Mindanao and Sulu and took captives. In response, Muslim raiders launched attacks on Spanish-controlled towns in the Visayas.

=== Zheng He's voyages ===
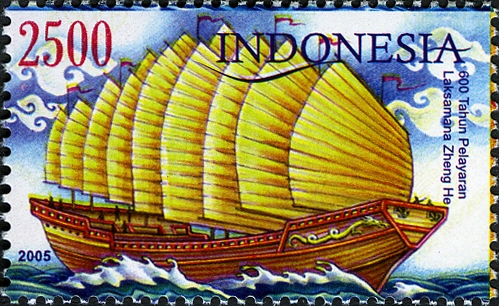
Stamp of Indonesia commemorating Zheng He's voyages to secure the maritime routes, usher urbanization and assist in creating a common identity

The Chinese Muslim mariner Zheng He is credited with founding several Chinese Muslim communities during China's early Ming dynasty.

=== Bruneian conquest (16th century) ===
In the year 1498–99, the Bruneian Empire conducted a series of raids against the natives of the Taytay in Palawan and the island of Mindoro which had been subjugated to the Islamic Bruneian Empire under Sultan Bolkiah.

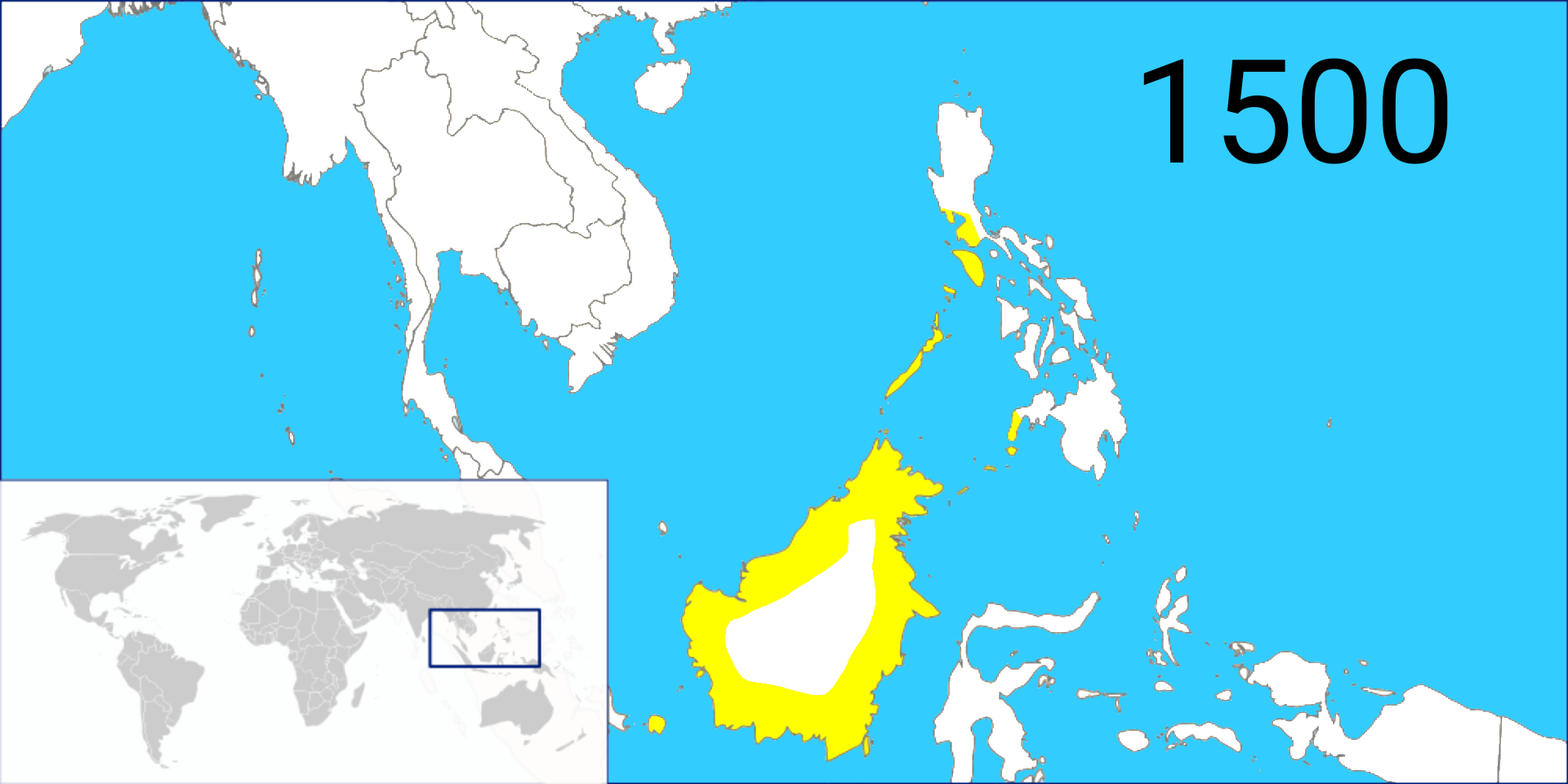
The extent of the Bruneian Empire

Furthermore, Sultan Bolkiah's victory over Sulu, as well as his marriages to Laila Menchanai the daughter of Sulu Sultan Amir al-Ombra (an uncle of Sharifa Mahandun married to Nakhoda Angging or Maharaja Anddin of Sulu), and to the daughter of Datu Kemin, widened Brunei's influence in the Philippines.

In Luzon, a new dynasty in Maynila began under a local leader who accepted Islam and became Rajah Salalila who created a union through his marriage to the daughter of Sultan Bolkiah and Puteri Laila Menchanai of Sulu, which established Brunei's influence in the region. He also posed a trading challenge to the House of Lakandula in Tondo. Islam was further strengthened by the arrival of Muslim traders and from Jolo, Mindanao, Malaysia, and Indonesia.

=== Spanish encounter ===
Rajah Sulayman was the Rajah of Maynila, a polity at the mouth of the Pasig River where it meets Manila Bay, at the time the Spanish forces first came to Luzon.

Sulayman resisted the Spanish forces along with Rajah Matanda and Lakan Dula.

Moro (derived from the Spanish word meaning Moors) is the appellation inherited from the Spaniards, for Filipino Muslims of Mindanao. The Spanish distinguished the Moro from the Indios, which referred to the Christianized people of Luzon and the Visayas. Islam continued to spread in Mindanao, from centers such as Sulu and Cotabato.

The Muslims seek to establish an independent Islamic province in Mindanao to be named Bangsamoro. The term Bangsamoro is a combination of an Old Malay word meaning nation or state with the Spanish word Moro which means Muslim. A significant Moro Rebellion occurred during the Philippine–American War. Conflicts and rebellion have continued in the Philippines from the pre-colonial period up to the present. Other related issue with the Moro secession is the territorial dispute of eastern Sabah in Malaysia which was claimed by the Sultanate of Sulu as their territory.

The Moros have a history of resistance against Spanish, American, and Japanese rule for over 400 years. The violent armed struggle against the Spanish, Americans, Japanese and Filipinos is considered by current Moro (Muslim) leaders as part of the four centuries long "national liberation movement" of the Bangsamoro (Muslim Nation). The 400-year-long resistance against the Japanese, Filipinos, Americans, and Spanish by the Moro/Muslims persisted and morphed into their current war for independence against the Philippine state.

Muslim leaders in Zamboanga petitioned the Ottoman Empire to send a representative to advise them on religious matters. A scholar from the Shaykh al-Islām was sent in response.

=== Modern age ===
In 2012, research was conducted on cultural properties in Islamic areas in Mindanao. The research included the 'Maradika' Qur'an of Bayang, the notes found in the Qur'an of Bayang, the Qur'an and Islamic manuscripts of the Sheikh Ahmad Bashir collection, the 'Dibolodan' Qur'an of Bacong in Marantao, the Qur'an and the prayer scroll of Guro sa Masiu in Taraka, the 'Story of the Prophet Muhammad' at the Growing Memorial Research Center of the Dansalan College, and the Islamic Manuscript Art of the Philippines. In 2014, the Maradika Qur'an of Bayang was declared as a National Cultural Treasure, the first Islamic manuscript in the Philippines to be declared as such.

==== Bangsa Sug and Bangsa Moro ====
In 2018, a unification gathering of all the sultans of the Sulu archipelago and representatives from all ethnic communities in the Sulu archipelago commenced in Zamboanga City, declaring themselves as the Bangsa Sug peoples and separating them from the Bangsa Moro peoples of mainland central Mindanao. They cited the complete difference in cultures and customary ways of life as the primary reason for their separation from the Muslims of mainland central Mindanao. They also called the government to establish a separate Philippine state, called Bangsa Sug, from mainland Bangsa Moro or to incorporate the Sulu archipelago to whatever state is formed in the Zamboanga peninsula, if ever federalism in the Philippines is approved in the coming years.

==== Balik Islam ====
There is also a growing community of Filipino converts to Islam, known popularly as Balik Islam (return or returnees to Islam), often led by former Christian missionary converts.

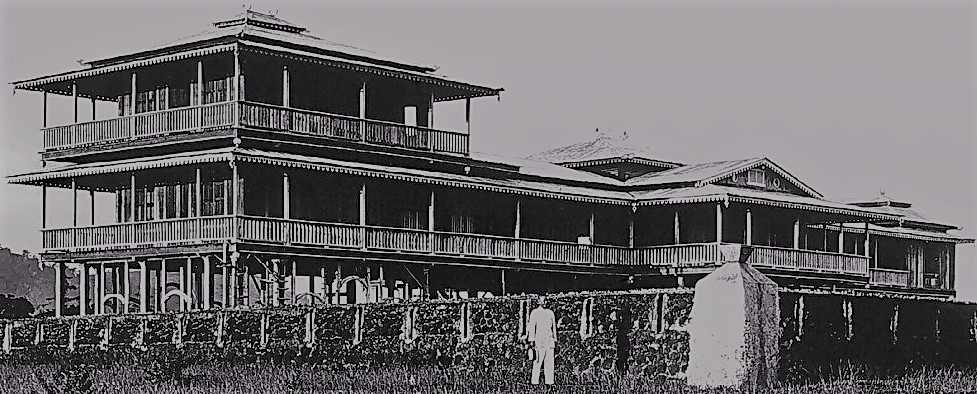
Daru Jambangan (Palace of Flowers) in Maimbung, Sulu before it was destroyed by a typhoon in 1932. It used to be the largest royal palace built in the Philippines. A campaign to faithfully re-establish it in the town of Maimbung has been ongoing since 1933. A very small replica of the palace was made in a nearby town in the 2010s, but it was noted that the replica does not mean that the campaign to reconstruct the palace in Maimbung has stopped as the replica does not manifest the true essence of a Sulu royal palace. In 2013, Maimbung was officially designated as the royal capital of the Sultanate of Sulu by the remaining members of the Sulu royal family. Almost all Sulu royals who have died since the 19th century up to the present have been buried around the palace grounds.

At the end of 2014, the NCMF estimated that there were 200,000 Filipinos who had converted to Islam since the 1970s.

== Bangsamoro Region ==
Most Muslims in the Philippines live on the island of Mindanao, the Sulu Archipelago and Palawan, also known collectively as MINSUPALA. The Bangsamoro Autonomous Region in Muslim Mindanao (BARMM) is the region of the Philippines that is composed of all the Philippines' predominantly Muslim provinces, namely: Basilan (except Isabela City), Lanao del Sur, Maguindanao del Norte, Maguindanao del Sur, Sulu and Tawi-Tawi. It also comprised the cities of Marawi, Lamitan, and Cotabato City and the 63 Barangays in Cotabato who opted to join the autonomous region. It is the only region that has its own government. The regional capital is at Cotabato City, which is outside the jurisdiction of the former and defunct Autonomous Region in Muslim Mindanao (ARMM) but is now part of the Bangsamoro region after the majority of the residents voted in favor for their inclusion in the autonomous region in the ratification of the Bangsamoro Organic Law on January 21, 2019.

Other provinces and regions with large Muslim populations as well have a significant history with Moro/Muslims include Metro Manila, Cavite, Rizal, Bulacan, Bicol Region, Metro Cebu, Eastern Visayas, southern Palawan, Soccsksargen, Lanao del Norte, Davao City and the Zamboanga Peninsula. However, these are not part of the Bangsamoro region.

== Demographics ==
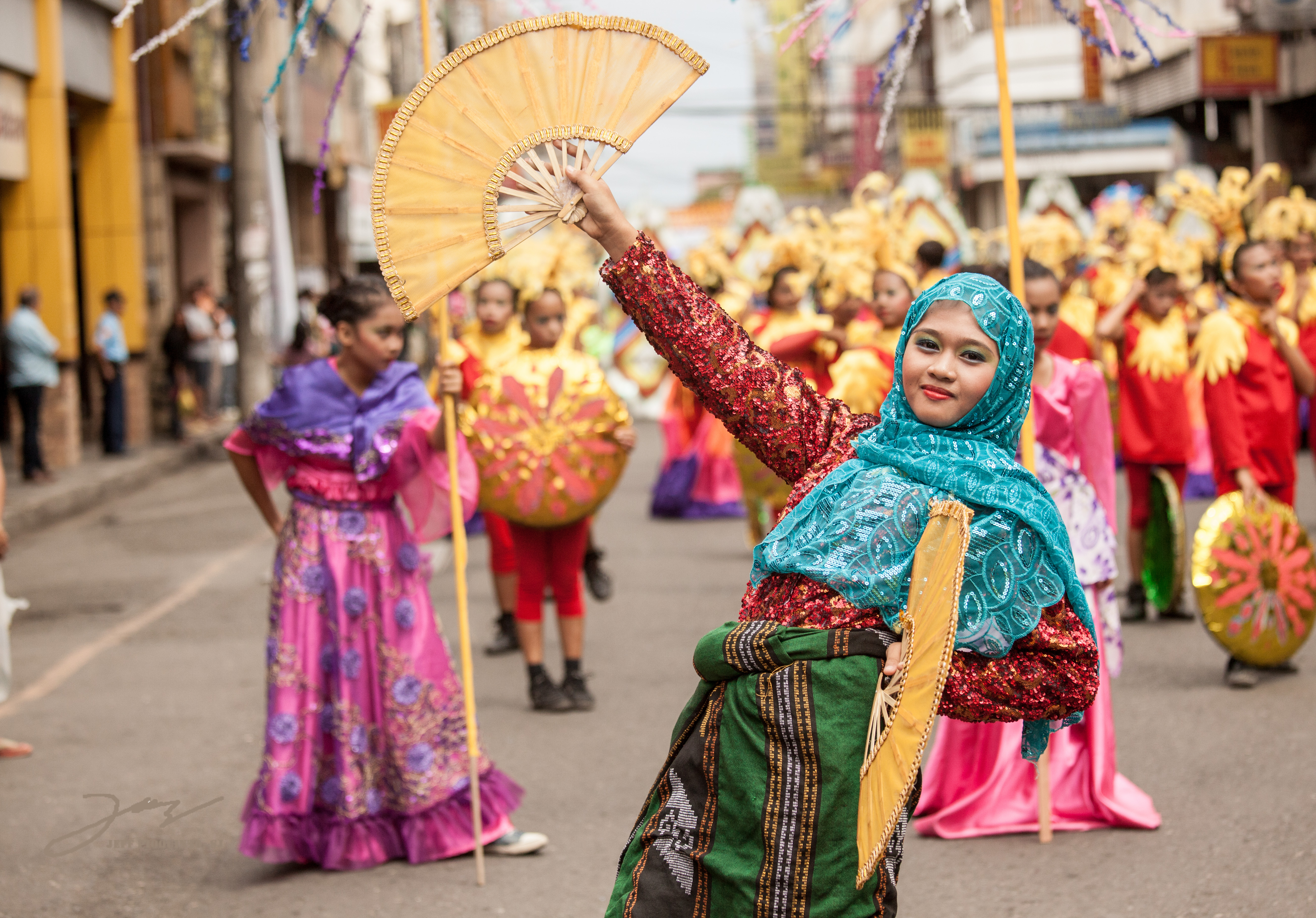
Muslim Dancer - Araw ng Dabaw in 2014

The predominantly Muslim ethnolinguistic groups of the Philippines are the Iranun, Jama Mapun, Kalagan, Kalibugan, Maguindanao, Maranao, Molbog, Sama (including the Badjao, Balanguingui, and various Tawi-Tawi Sama groups), Sangil, Tausūg, and Yakan. Muslims who were formerly Christians and animists are called the Balik Islam.

=== Table ===
Muslim population by regions, provinces and highly urbanized city according to the 2020 census
Region, province and city	Muslims	Total	% Muslims
Philippines	6,981,710	108,667,043	6.42%
National Capital Region	173,346	13,403,551	1.29%
Manila	41,176	1,837,785	2.24%
Mandaluyong	1,854	419,333	0.44%
Marikina	2,058	452,961	0.46%
Pasig	9,805	801,439	1.22%
Quezon City	36,599	2,950,493	1.24%
San Juan City	2,267	124,699	1.82%
Caloocan	9,611	1,659,025	0.58%
Malabon	732	379,463	0.19%
Navotas	416	246,743	0.17%
Valenzuela	2,100	713,181	0.29%
Las Piñas	4,006	604,283	0.66%
Makati	3,273	624,032	0.52%
Muntinlupa	5,184	519,112	1.00%
Parañaque	8,781	686,313	1.28%
Pasay	5,659	437,003	1.29%
Taguig	39,605	882,622	4.48%
Pateros	220	65,064	0.34%
Cordillera Administrative Region	5,817	1,791,121	0.32%
Abra	255	250,309	0.10%
Apayao	51	123,937	0.04%
Benguet	792	459,468	0.17%
Baguio City	3,935	363,151	1.08%
Ifugao	91	207,130	0.04%
Kalinga	633	229,328	0.28%
Mountain Province	60	157,798	0.04%
Ilocos Region	12,475	5,292,297	0.24%
Ilocos Norte	1,489	608,508	0.24%
Ilocos Sur	1,932	704,218	0.27%
La Union	2,021	820,343	0.25%
Pangasinan	7,033	3,159,228	0.22%
Cagayan Valley	7,249	3,679,748	0.20%
Batanes	1	18,593	0.01%
Cagayan	2,287	1,265,540	0.18%
Isabela	3,453	1,695,539	0.20%
Nueva Vizcaya	1,159	496,546	0.23%
Quirino	349	203,530	0.17%
Central Luzon	46,588	12,387,811	0.38%
Aurora	687	234,991	0.29%
Bataan	3,477	849,575	0.41%
Bulacan	13,306	3,696,937	0.36%
Nueva Ecija	5,729	2,306,751	0.25%
Pampanga	6,160	2,433,144	0.25%
Tarlac	4,168	1,499,064	0.28%
Zambales	5,594	647,545	0.86%
Olongapo City	2,359	258,639	0.91%
CALABARZON	80,057	16,139,770	0.50%
Batangas	10,944	2,902,855	0.38%
Cavite	34,969	4,318,663	0.81%
Laguna	12,329	3,373,136	0.37%
Quezon	2,418	1,945,444	0.12%
Lucena City	1,753	278,347	0.63%
Rizal	17,644	3,321,325	0.53%
Southwestern Tagalog	113,288	3,212,287	3.53%
Marinduque	227	238,830	0.10%
Occidental Mindoro	608	521,444	0.12%
Oriental Mindoro	2,103	906,661	0.23%
Palawan	101,235	934,669	10.83%
Puerto Princesa City	8,887	302,611	2.94%
Romblon	228	308,072	0.07%
Bicol Region	9,090	6,067,290	0.15%
Albay	2,010	1,372,550	0.15%
Camarines Norte	1,112	628,807	0.18%
Camarines Sur	3,021	2,062,277	0.15%
Catanduanes	322	270,775	0.12%
Masbate	1,304	906,731	0.14%
Sorsogon	1,321	826,150	0.16%
Western Visayas	9,784	7,935,531	0.12%
Aklan	2,609	612,985	0.43%
Antique	1,020	611,478	0.17%
Capiz	373	803,879	0.05%
Guimaras	118	187,576	0.06%
Iloilo	1,339	2,048,039	0.07%
Iloilo City	1,128	455,287	0.25%
Negros Occidental	1,778	2,618,672	0.07%
Bacolod City	1,419	597,615	0.24%
Central Visayas	16,412	8,046,285	0.20%
Bohol	2,547	1,390,524	0.18%
Cebu	2,812	3,309,850	0.08%
Cebu City	3,462	958,626	0.36%
Lapu-Lapu City	4,650	494,672	0.94%
Mandaue City	1,031	361,051	0.29%
Negros Oriental	1,786	1,428,548	0.13%
Siquijor	124	103,014	0.12%
Eastern Visayas	5,568	4,531,512	0.12%
Biliran	462	178,715	0.26%
Eastern Samar	352	475,847	0.07%
Leyte	2,160	1,771,011	0.12%
Tacloban City	589	249,415	0.24%
Northern Samar	524	636,995	0.08%
Western Samar	697	791,045	0.09%
Southern Leyte	784	428,484	0.18%
Zamboanga Peninsula	703,823	3,862,588	18.22%
Zamboanga del Norte	73,555	1,046,017	7.03%
Zamboanga del Sur	72,363	1,048,402	6.90%
Zamboanga City	364,646	969,391	37.62%
Zamboanga Sibugay	106,587	668,648	15.94%
Isabela de Basilan	86,672	130,130	66.60%
Northern Mindanao	423,317	5,007,798	8.45%
Bukidnon	24,000	1,537,629	1.56%
Camiguin	234	92,696	0.25%
Lanao del Norte	328,468	721,716	45.51%
Iligan City	43,550	362,182	12.02%
Misamis Occidental	1,757	614,951	0.29%
Misamis Oriental	7,711	954,953	0.81%
Cagayan de Oro City	17,597	723,671	2.43%
Davao Region	185,248	5,223,802	3.55%
Compostela Valley	18,296	766,299	2.39%
Davao del Norte	27,702	1,115,167	2.48%
Davao del Sur	17,937	679,457	2.64%
Davao City	69,122	1,770,988	3.90%
Davao Occidental	17,236	316,907	5.44%
Davao Oriental	34,955	574,984	6.08%
SOCCSKSARGEN	685,702	4,351,773	15.76%
Cotabato	246,006	1,273,594	19.32%
South Cotabato	52,530	973,146	5.40%
General Santos City	67,914	695,410	9.77%
Sultan Kudarat	257,723	851,554	30.27%
Sarangani	61,529	558,069	11.03%
Caraga Region	12,777	2,795,340	0.46%
Agusan del Norte	1,563	386,211	0.40%
Butuan City	3,854	370,910	1.04%
Agusan del Sur	2,492	737,991	0.34%
Surigao del Norte	1,996	531,753	0.38%
Surigao del Sur	2,822	640,512	0.44%
Dinagat Islands	50	127,963	0.04%
Bangsamoro Autonomous Region in Muslim Mindanao	4,491,169	4,938,539	90.94%
Basilan	382,242	425,111	89.92%
Lanao del Sur	1,131,726	1,194,507	94.74%
Maguindanao	1,392,207	1,666,353	83.55%
Sulu	951,127	998,675	95.24%
Tawi-Tawi	426,403	438,545	97.23%
Special Geographic Area	207,464	215,348	96.34%

== Islamic schools of thought ==
=== Sufism ===
Sufism was also brought through travelling merchants and often interspersed with the classical Ahlus Sunnah Wal Jama'ah or Sunni Muslims. Representatives of this were the makhdumin, the first missionaries of Islam in the Philippines. Examples are the Darul Abdulqadir Jilani Dergah in Talon-Talon, Zamboanga City, and the Maharlika Blue Mosque community in Taguig City.

There are already many practitioners of Sufism in the country from different social status. The orders or tariqas that are present in the country are: the Naqshbandi Aliya, Naqshbandi Chisti, Qadiri, Rifai, Shattari, Rifai Qadiri Shadhili(Alawī Ḥusaynī Nīnowī), Tijani, and Khalwati. The Naqshbandi Aliya tariqa headed by Shaykh Khalid Ismael have the most followers, concentrated in Manila, Cebu, Zamboanga, Sulu, and Tawi-Tawi.The Rifāʿī–Qādirī–Shādhilī ṭarīqah is under the leadership of Muqaddam Shaykh Al Johan Ilacad, while the Tijāniyyah ṭarīqah is led by the Naqīb al-Sādāt al-Ashrāf Dr. Calingalan Hussin Caluang.There are also Sufis from the students and alumni of known universities, such as the Ateneo de Manila University, the Ateneo de Zamboanga University, and Western Mindanao State University.

==== Classical Traditional Southeast Asian Sufism (Sufism) ====
Arrived during the early stages of Islam in Southeast Asia, it was brought through travelling merchants and was often interspersed with Sufism. Adherents are required to follow one school of law (madhhab) as a guidance in their legal and daily affairs.

Generally, in Southeast Asia, most adherents of the ASWJ follow the Shafi'i school of law, and the Ash'ari school of theology. Examples are the Sabiel al-Muhtadien and Darul Makhdumin Madrasah, located in Zamboanga, Basilan, Sulu, and Tawi-Tawi.

=== Shi'ism ===
The first Shi'as to arrive, together with the Sufis, were the Isma'ilis and the Kaysaniyyas (earlier offshoots of Shi'ism), who eventually blended with the Sunnis. More Shi'as would later arrive at the height of the 1979 Islamic Revolution in Iran. Examples are the Masjid Imam Mahdi led by Sheikh Abu Mahdi Anawari in Suterville, Zamboanga City, and the Masjid Karbala in Marawi City.

Shi’a Islam has continued to grow in the Philippines, particularly in the capital, Manila. In early 2026, the movement received increased attention due to the activities of Sheikh Yunus al-Filibini, a Filipino Shi’a Muslim scholar and Balik Islam revert who studied at the Hawza Ilmiya in Najaf, Iraq. As a Filipino Shi’a Muslim scholar, al-Filibini organized educational programs, propagation initiatives, and interfaith dialogue events, which contributed to greater awareness of Shi’a practices within the metropolitan area.

=== Indigenous Islam ===
Also referred to as, Ilmu kamaasan, Ilmu kamatoahan, Ilmu sa Matoah, and Ilmu Minatoah (knowledge of the elders), it is an indigenized amalgamation of Islam from the preceding schools of thought and local cultural customs, this is actually contextualized and simplified according to how the elders have understood Islam and the process of Islamization of the communities. These are normally communities located in far rural areas, mostly among them are Tausugs, Sama-Badjaos, Yakans, Kalagans and to the some extent, Maguindanaons and Iranuns.

=== Salafism ===
Salafism (Arabic: السلفية, as-Salafiyyah) denotes the traditional Sunni methodology rooted directly in the Quran, the authentic prophetic tradition, and the collective understanding of the Salaf al-Salih (The pious early generations, encompassing the companions and their immediate successors). Rather than an emergent sect, later theological division, or modern reform movement, as-Salafiyyah is identified as orthodox Islam in its original prophetic framework. Scholars and adherents emphasize that the methodology does not call people to adopt a novel sectarian label or identity other than “Muslim”, rather it aims to call Muslims back to pure Islam.

Examples of these groups are the Mahad Moro, Mahad Salamat, and Mahad Quran wal Hadith Zamboanga City, the Mercy Foundation in Manila and Davao City, the Al-Maarif Educational Center in Baguio City, and the Jamiatul Waqf al-Islamie, and Jamiato Monib al-Kouzbary al-Arabiyah in Marawi City.

=== Ash'ari wal Maturidi ===
Ash’arism and Maturidism are two historical traditions of speculative theology (‘ilm al-Kalam) that developed within Sunni Islam during the 9th and 10th CE. Founded respectively by Abū al-Ḥasan al-Ashʿarī and Abū Manṣūr al-Māturīdī.

They have a few educational institutions in the country, such as the Jamiatu Al-Hikmah in Mulondo, Lanao del Sur and the Muhajireen wal Ansar Academy in Taguig City as well as the 3 prominent ones namely, Darul Ifta Region 9 and Palawan, Sabiel al-Muhtadien and Darul Makhdumin Madrasah, located in Zamboanga, Basilan, Sulu, and Tawi-Tawi. The Sunni center of the Philippines is Region 9 headed by the Grand Mufti of Darul Ifta Region 9 and Palawan led by Grand Mufti Walid Abubakar who succeeded Grand Mufti Abdulbaki Abubakar.

=== Tablighi Jama'at ===
The Tablighi Jama'at is a revivalist movement originated in South Asia, aiming at revitalizing Muslims’ practice of Islam. Politically neutral and tolerant, they are characterized by khurūj (regular traveling from one mosque to another) events to call people back to the mosque and pray, as well as their annual gatherings called ijtema'at. They are the most moderate, apolitical, and pacifist among the different Muslim groups.

Most Filipino Tablighi Jama'at members are Ash'ari and Maturidi scholars, such as Sheikh Aminollah Mimbala Batua and Mawlana Mahdi Batua, as well as Filipino ASWJ scholars like Mawlana Dr. Abdullatif Cadhe Sirad.

They can be found in many mosques, most prominent is the Jama'at of Mawlana Mahdi Batua of the Masjid Al-Dahab in Quiapo, Manila.

=== Nurcu ===
Nurcu is an Islamic movement calling people back to Islam. The basis of unity of this group is the multi-volume compilation of articles and books called the Risale-i Nur ("epistle of light" in Turkish), which is a voluminous commentary on the Quran and Hadith by Bediuzzaman Said Nursî, one of the most influential thinkers of the 20th century.

Nursî's main theme in his works is answering modern man's major crisis – the absence of certainty of Faith. The Risale-i Nur is a monumental work that aims to address this. He also said that all suffering in the world is because of three things: ignorance, poverty, and misunderstanding. In his opinion, this can be healed by knowledge, service, and understanding others. This is elucidated in his magnum opus as a guide to Muslims.

This group is active in many parts of the country and has trained many educators. Notable among them is the Risale-i Nur Institute in Cagayan de Oro City and their dershaneler in different cities across the Philippines. They are also responsible for publishing many Islamic books for use in elementary, junior high, and high schools, as well as universities and colleges. It was tested in the former Autonomous Region of Muslim Mindanao, during the term of then CHED Regional Secretary Norma Sharief.

=== Hizmet ===
It was founded by Turkish scholar Fethullah Gülen. Their principles actually come from the Risale-i Nur, except that in the present political context, it has been listed as a terrorist organization by the Turkish government since 2016.

=== Quranism ===
Quranists are the Muslims who regard Quran as their sole scriptural authority have varying opinions on Hadiths, but most of them criticizing and rejecting Hadiths on what they perceive contradictory to the Quran, therefore they regard them as uncanonical and are often being called a man-made collection of books. Although the belief of the Quran-only Muslims believed to be historically dated back since the time of Muhammad, the prophet of Islam, it has been relatively a growing trend in the recent times thanks to social media.

Although Quranists are not formally recognized or widespread community in the Philippines, it is estimated that there are small number of Filipinos openly identify as Quranist Muslims, who mostly came from their Sunni backgrounds, with one out of ten rejected hadiths in favor of depending on Quran alone.

=== Ahmadi Religion of Peace and Light ===
Derived from Shia Islam, the Ahmadi Religion of Peace and Light (AROPL), also called the Ahmadi Religion (not to be confused with the Sunni- and Sufi-derived messianist sect of Ahmadiyyah), is a messianist syncretic religious movement founded and led by an Egyptian-American religious leader Abdullah Hashem Aba as-Sadiq, a follower of Iraqi Shia Muslim cleric Ahmad al-Hassan, hence the name of the movement. Abdullah Hashem claimed and is believed by his followers to be the al-Qa'im (the second Mahdi), as Ahmad al-Hassan is the first Mahdi, who is also the key figure of the movement. Having elements of Judaism, Christianity as well as Zoroastrianism, Hinduism, Jainism, Buddhism and other world religions, many of AROPL's doctrines oppose those of traditional Islam, for example, the movement believes that the Kaaba is actually in Petra, Jordan instead of Mecca, Saudi Arabia; hijab and niqab wearing is not mandatory but they are either allowed; and the belief in reincarnation. Unlike also traditional Islam, the movement has its own sacred book called The Goal of the Wise, authored by Abdullah Hashem. AROPL's headquarters is located in Manchester, United Kingdom.

The religious movement is relatively small, although increasing members are estimated to be less than a thousand followers globally, with at least three or four Filipino converts are reported.

== Traditional art by Muslims ==
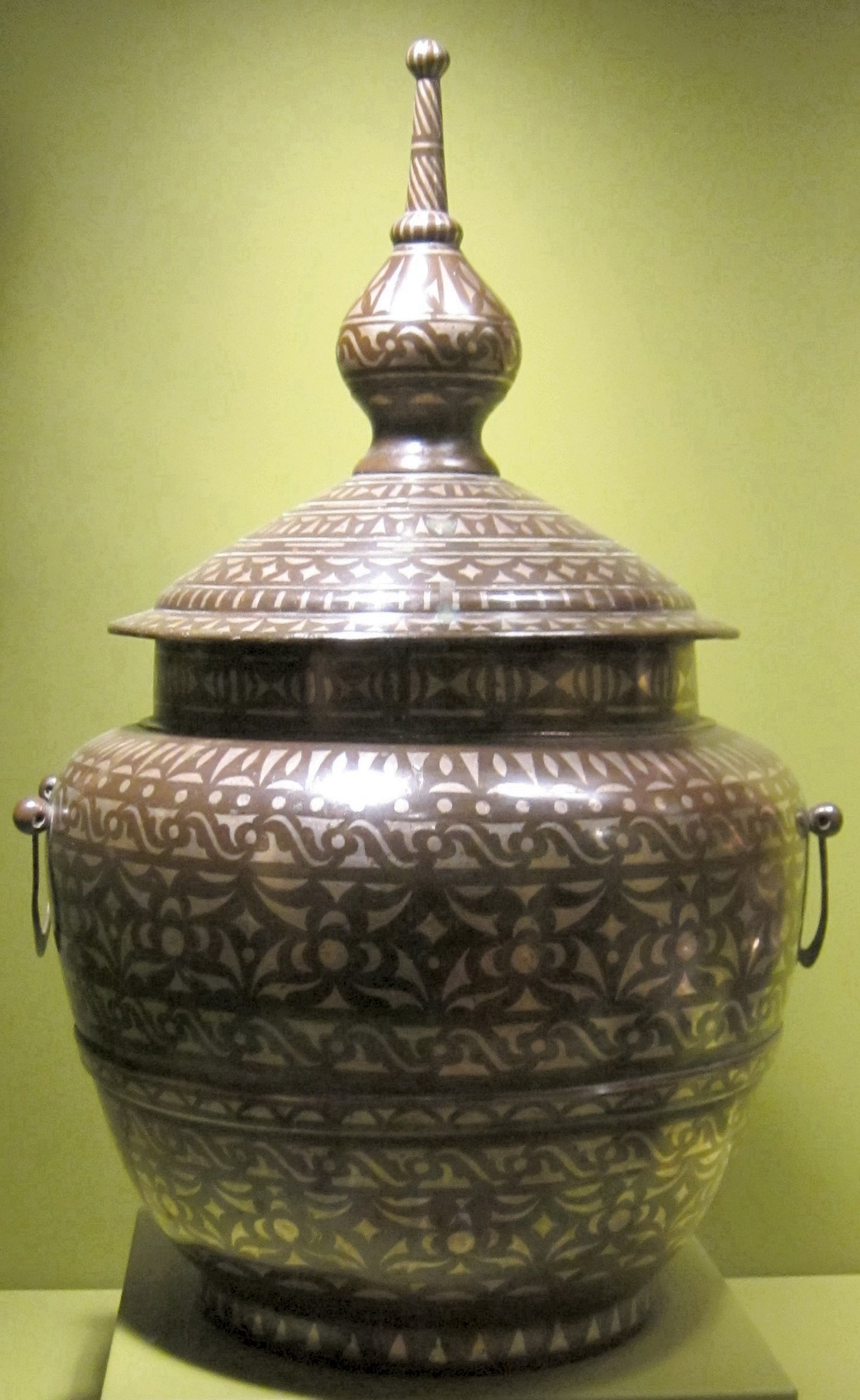
An Indigenous tribal food jar known as gadur, well known for its brass with silver inlay

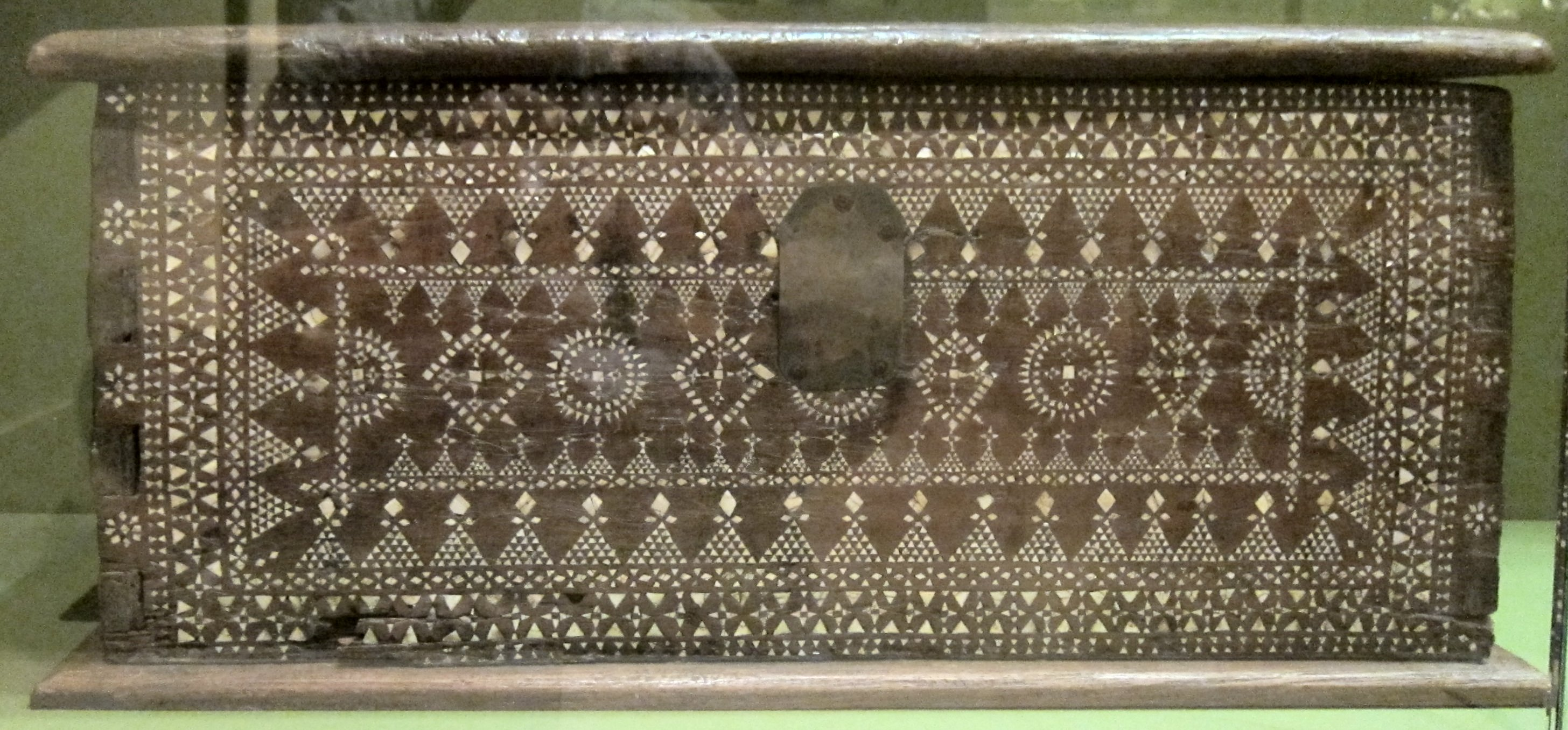
A chest made of wood and bone inlay

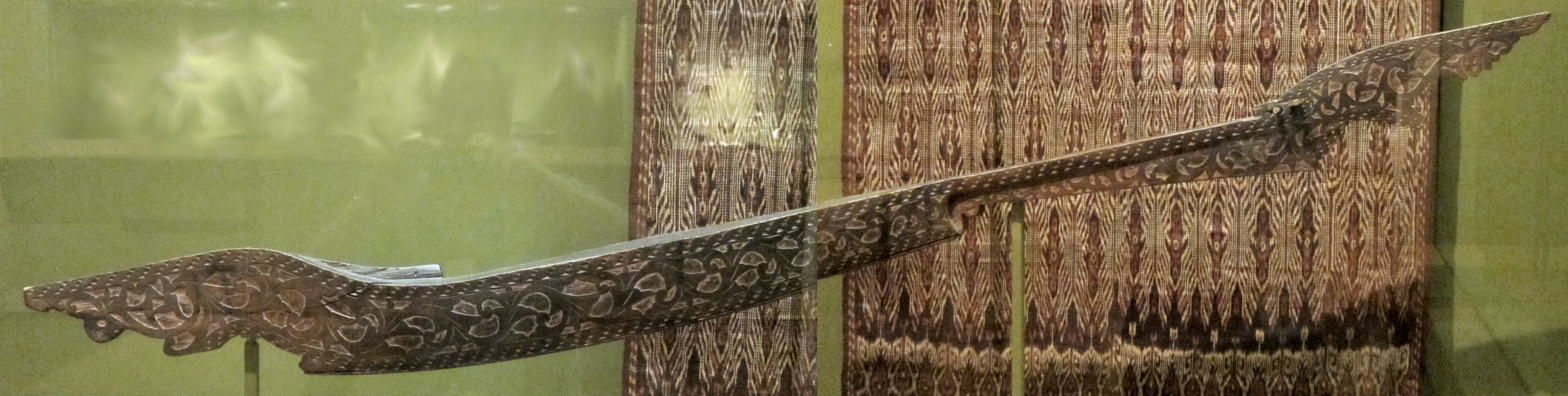
Kutiyapi the native boat-shaped lute of the archipelago

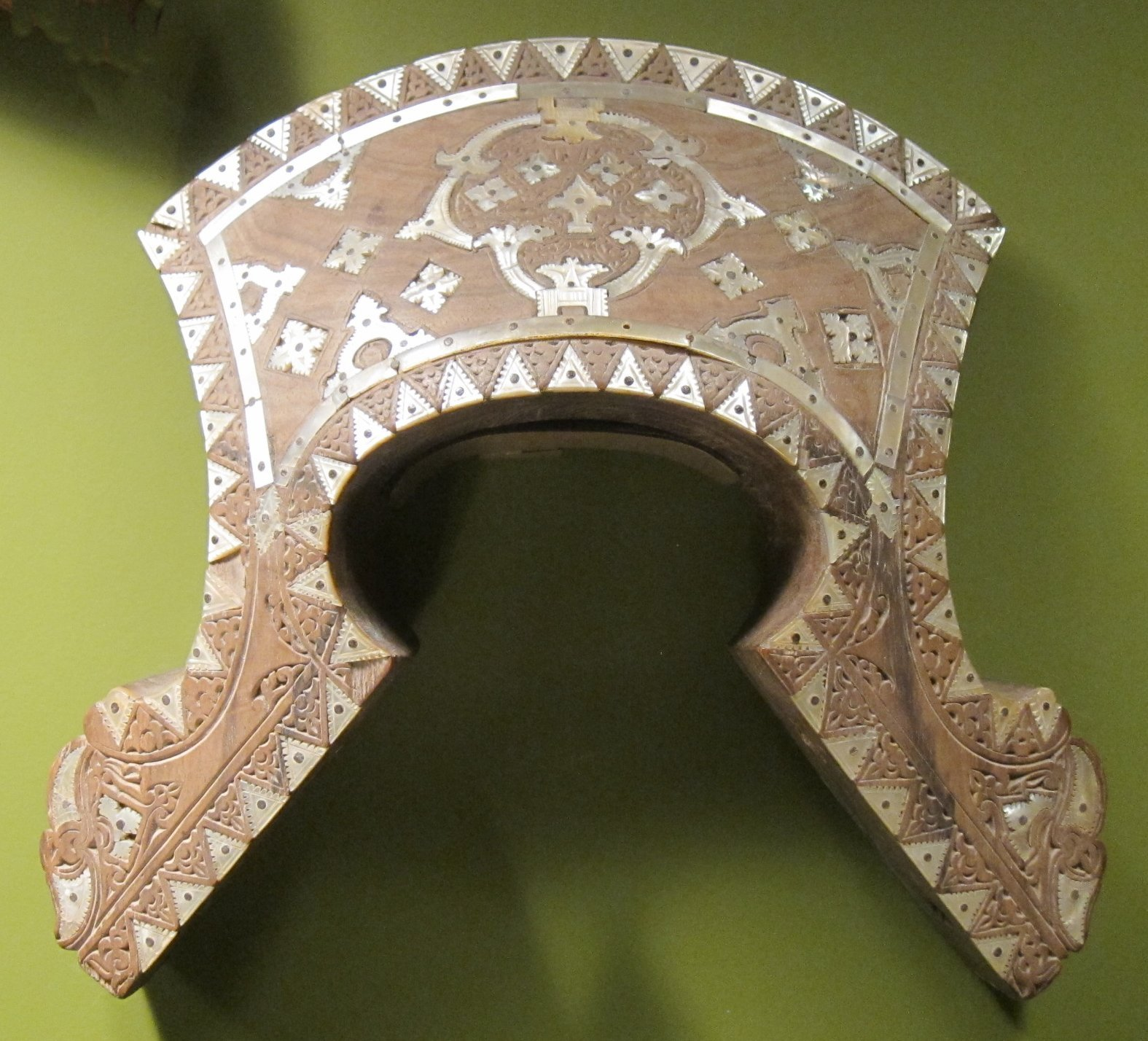
Saddle panel, wood with shell inlay

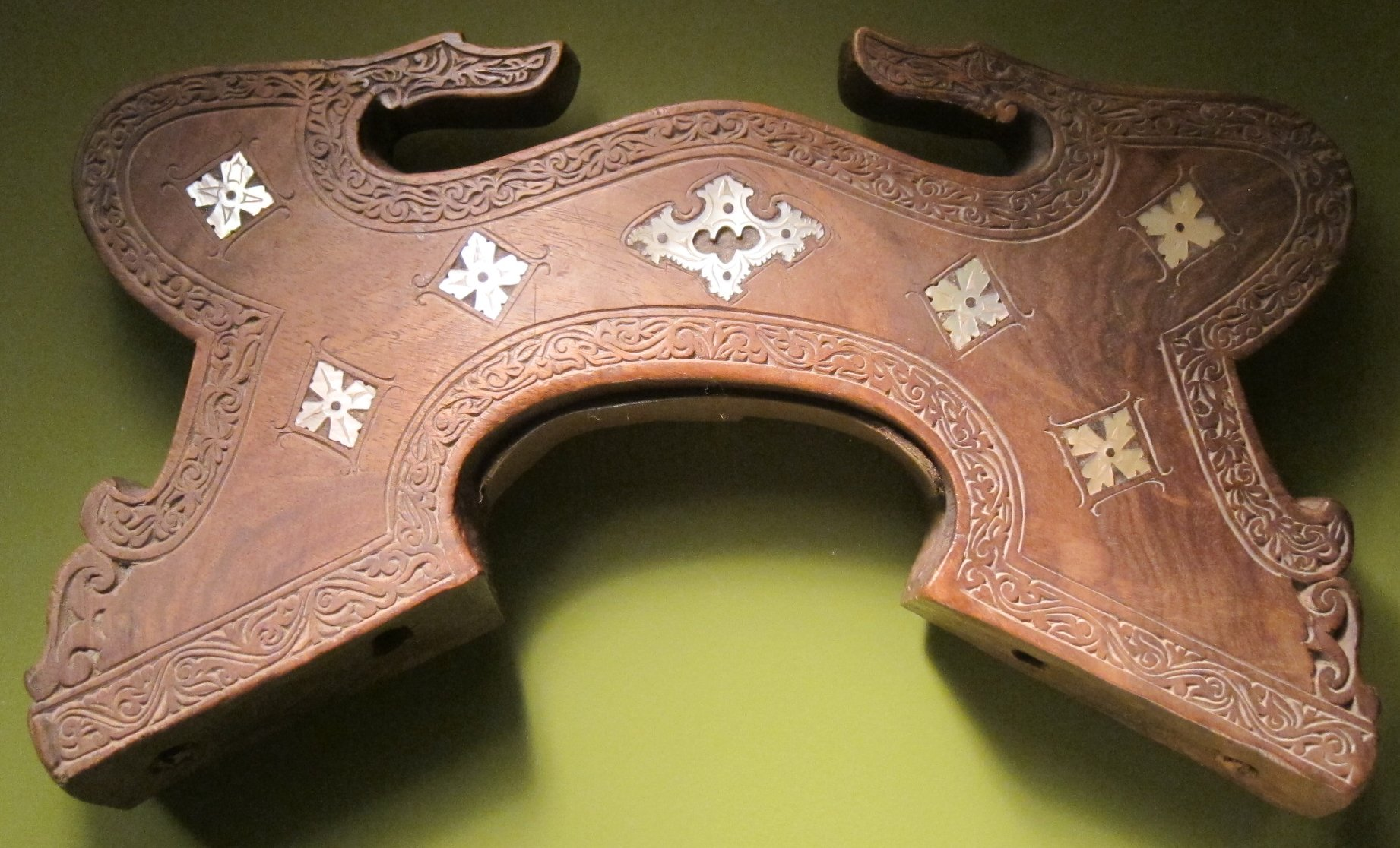
Saddle panel, wood with shell inlay

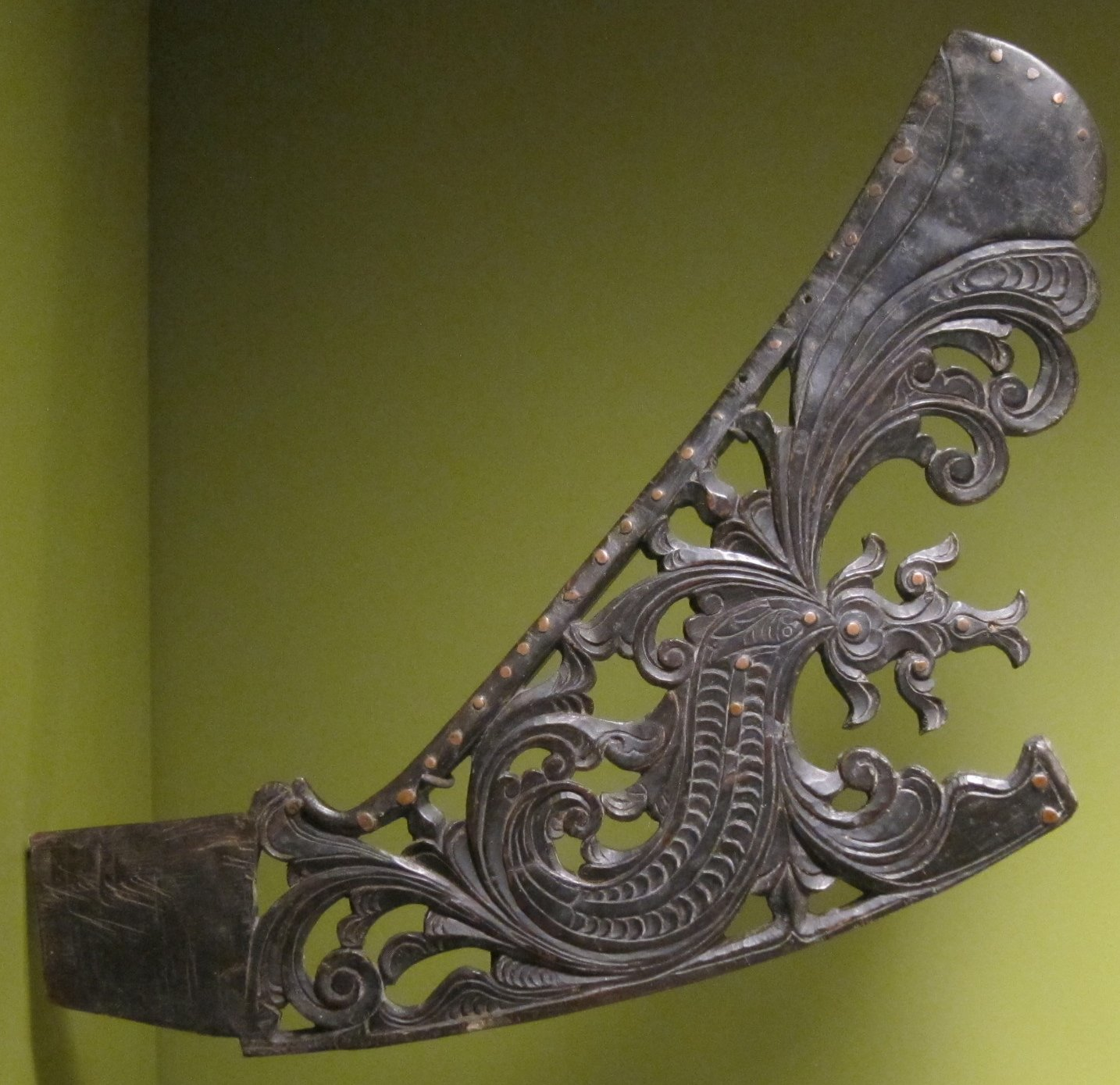
Kubing (native jaw harp) handle, horn with brass studs

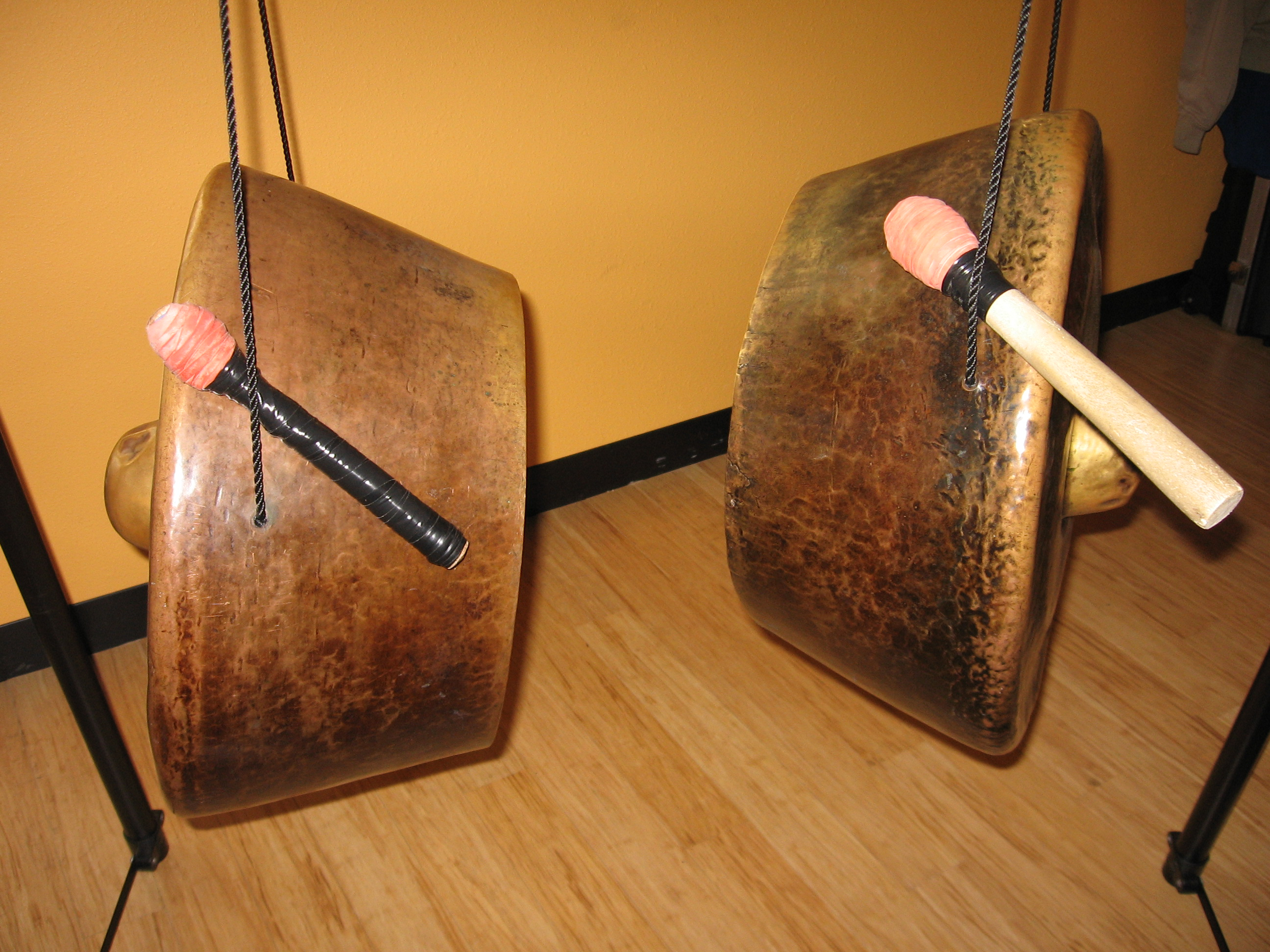
Agung - large bass nipple-gongs native to the Philippines, and other parts of Maritime Southeast Asia

== See also ==
- List of mosques in the Philippines
- Balik Islam
- Religion in the Philippines
- Grand Mufti Walid Abubakar
