= Rajah Baguinda =

Rajah Baguinda Ali
- Ruler of the Principality of Sulu
- Predecessor: none
- Successor: Sayyid Abubakar Abirin
Names
- Baguinda Ali, later on Rajah Baguinda Ali
- House: Principality of Sulu, predecessor to the Sultanate of Sulu

Rajah Baguinda Ali, also known as Rajah Baginda Ali, Rajah Baginda, Raha Baguinda, or Rajah Baguinda, was a prince from a Minangkabau kingdom in Sumatra, Indonesia called "Pagaruyung". (Baginda/Baguinda is a Minangkabau honorific for prince.) He was the leader of the forming polity in Sulu, Philippines, which later turned into the Sultanate of Sulu.

== History ==
=== Arrival in Sulu ===
Baginda Ali arrived in Buansa, Sulu, in 1390, just ten years after Sheikh Karim-ul Makhdum reached Sulu himself and brought Islam to the Philippines. Initially, the natives of Buansa were suspicious of him; they tried to sink his boats, to let him drown at sea. Baginda Ali fought back in defence and inquired to these people "why are you trying to drown me?" He insisted he came to Sulu out of travel and out of goodwill—to live among Sulu natives who, like him, were followers of Mohammad. The people of Sulu accepted his reasoning, and he eventually became one with the people. They even named him Rajah—Rajah Baguinda Ali. The preference of the people of Sulu to call him "Rajah" instead of "Sultan" connotes there was a pre-Islamic period in the history of the Sultanate of Sulu.

=== Baginda Ali and Abu Bakr ===
In 1450, a Johore -born Arab adventurer, Sayyid Abubakar bin Abirin, came to Sulu and lived with Rajah Baguinda Ali in Buansa.

Abubakar bin Abirin bore the titles Sayyid (alternatively spelled Saiyid, Sayyed, Seyyed, Sayed, Seyed, Syed, Seyd) and walShareef an honorific that denotes he was an accepted descendant of the Islamic prophet Muhammad through both the Imams Hassan and Hussain. His name is also alternatively spelled Sayyid walShareef Abu Bakr ibn Abirin AlHashmi. He was a Najeeb AlTarfayn Sayyid.

The genealogy of Sultan Sharif ul-Hashim describes him as a descendant of Muhammad, through his maternal bloodline, Sayyed Zainul Abidin of Hadhramaut, Yemen, who belongs to the fourteenth generation of Hussain, the grandson of Muhammad.

Rajah Baginda Ali had no male heir, but had a daughter called Dayang-dayang Paramisuli. (Dayang-dayang is an Austronesian honorific for "Lady", and precedes a woman's name to denote that she is of high rank and noble standing/noble blood.) Eventually Dayang-dayang Paramisuli married Sayyid Abubakar, and Baginda Ali named Abubakar as heir to the Principality.

Sayyid Abubakar began his rule in 1457. He changed the form of polity of Sulu, from a principality to a sultanate. He took a regnal name embellished with five titles, and thus, at the formation of the Sultanate of Sulu, he became known as Paduka Mahasari Maulana al Sultan Sharif ul-Hashim, or "The Master (Paduka) His Majesty (Mahasari), Protector (Maulana) and (al) Sultan (Sultan), Sharif (Sharif) of (ul-) Hashim (Hashim)". [The Sharif of Hashim part is a reference to his nobility as a descendant of the Hashim clan, a clan the Islamic prophet Muhammad was a part of.] His regnal name is often shortened to Sharif ul-Hashim.

== See also ==
- Karim-ul Makhdum
- Sayyid Abubakar Abirin
- Sultanate of Sulu
- Sulu
