= Dansalan Bato Ali Mosque =

Mosque in Lanao del Sur, Philippines

- Masjid Dansalan Bato Ali

- Location within Mindanao mainland Location within Philippines

Religion
- Affiliation: Islam

Location
- Location: Marawi City, Lanao del Sur, Bangsamoro
- Country: Philippines
- Interactive map of Dansalan Bato Ali Mosque
- Administration: Marawi Sultanate League
- Coordinates: 7°59′52″N 124°17′34″E

Architecture
- Established: 1950s
- Completed: 1950s (initial building); 1980 (reconstruction); 2023 (reconstruction)
- Destroyed: 1970s (initial building)
- Demolished: 2020

The Dansalan Bato Ali Mosque (Masjid Dansalan Bato Ali) is a mosque in Marawi City, Lanao del Sur, Philippines.

== History ==
=== Prior structures ===
The original structure of the mosque, formerly known as the Bato Ali Mosque was built sometime in the 1950s, which was burned and converted to a cemetery during the martial law period. The mosque was rebuilt with reconstruction works finished in 1980.

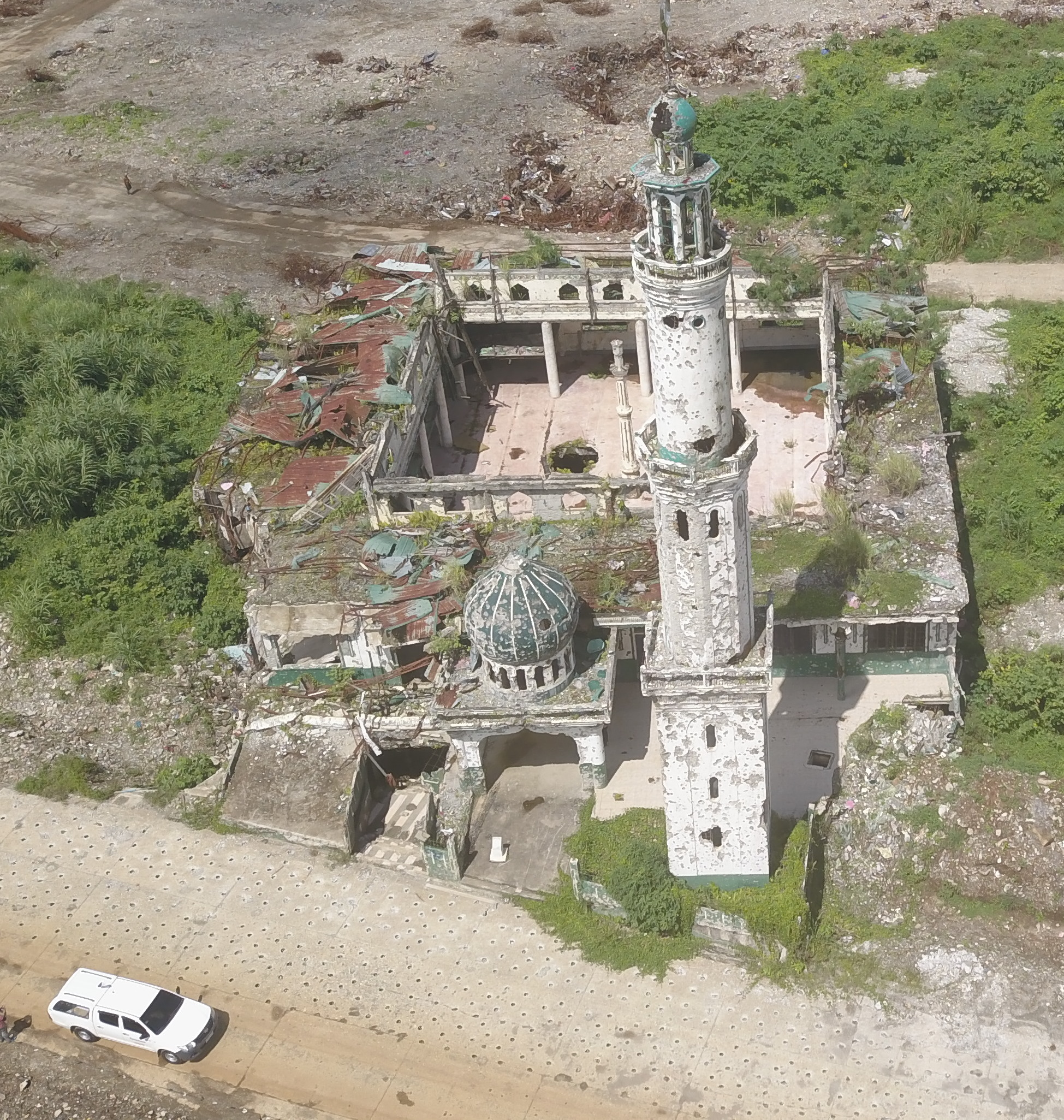
The mosque's damaged structure in 2020

During the siege of Marawi in May 2017, the mosque was among the structures captured by ISIL affiliated Maute group militants. Philippine government forces regained control of the city but several structures including the Bato Mosque was left heavily damaged after the battle.

The Bato Mosque was declared structurally unsound and it was deemed that it would be more feasible to demolish the structure and reconstruct a new one in its place. The Task Force Bangon Marawi will lead the demolition and reconstruction and Maranao architects were hired for the project. The move had consent from the Marawi Sultanate League, the administrating body of the mosque representing Lanao area's non-sovereign sultanates.

Demolition work of the current structure was set to begin on July 20, 2020.

=== Current structure ===
The current structure of the mosque was built following the aftermath of the Marawi siege. It was inaugurated on May 17, 2023.
