= Propagation =

Propagation can refer to:

- Chain propagation in a chemical reaction mechanism
- Crack propagation, the growth of a crack during the fracture of materials
- Propaganda, non-objective information used to further an agenda
- Reproduction, and other forms of multiplication or increase
  - Plant propagation, the production of more plants
  - Propagation of schema, in artificial reproduction
- Software propagation, the distribution of free software
- Wave propagation, the motion of a wave
  - Radio propagation, the application of wave propagation to radio communications

In music

- Propagation (album)
- "Propagation", a song by Lower Dens from the album Nootropics
- "Propagation", a song by Com Truise from the album Iteration
