= Sheikh Karimul Makhdum Mosque =

Mosque in Tawi-Tawi, Philippines

- Masjid Sheikh Karimul Makhdum
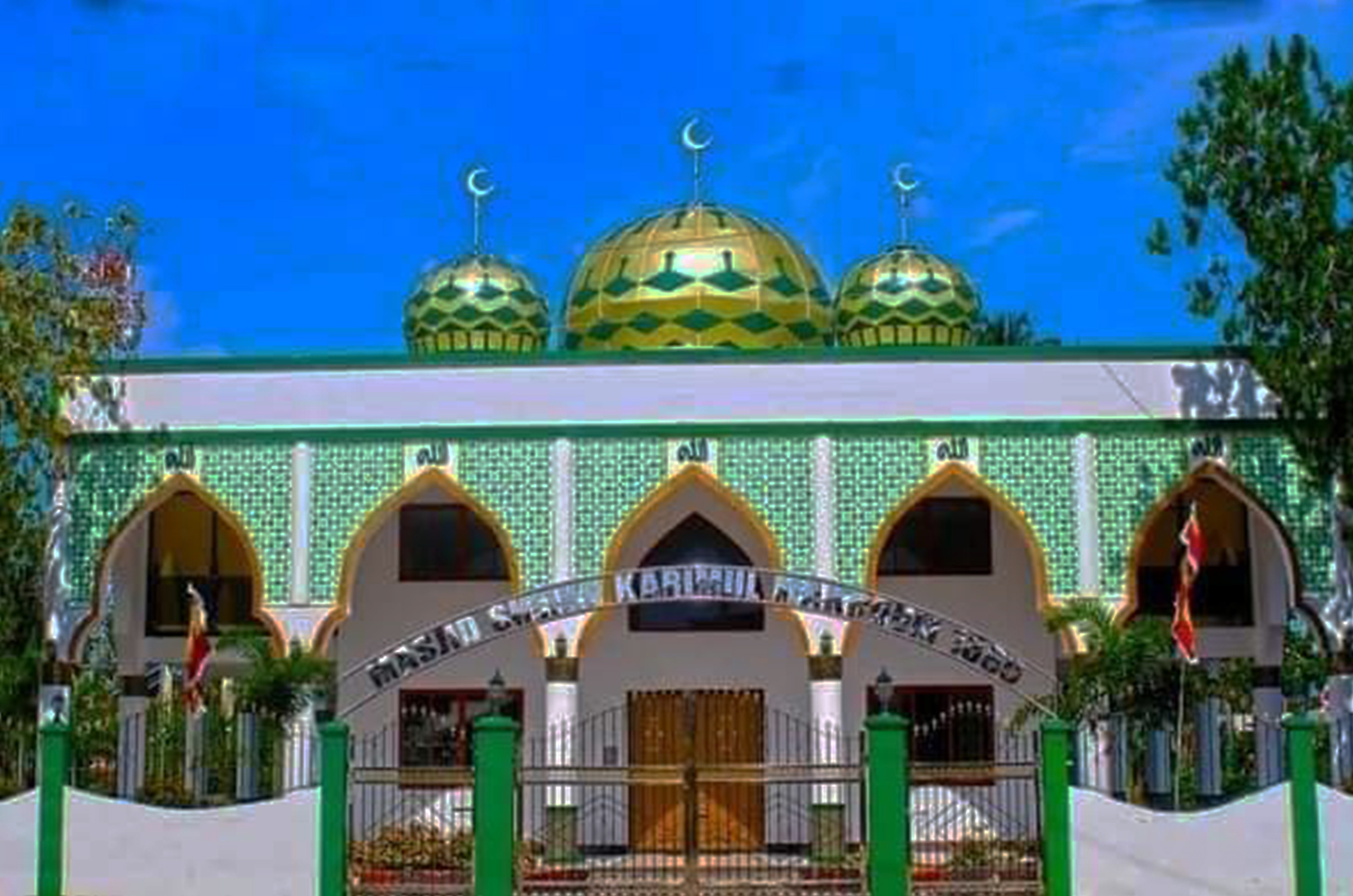

Religion
- Affiliation: Sunni Islam
- Sect: Sufi
- Year consecrated: 1380

Location
- Location: Simunul, Tawi-Tawi, Philippines
- Interactive map of Sheikh Karimul Makhdum Mosque
- Coordinates: 4.8980533°N 119.84924509999996°E

Architecture
- Type: Islamic
- Completed: 1960s (current building)
- National Historical Landmarks
- Official name: Sheik Karimol-Makhdum Mosque
- Designated: August 13, 1998

The Sheikh Karimul Makhdum Mosque is located in Barangay Tubig Indangan, Simunul, Tawi-Tawi, the Philippines. The current mosque building dates from the 1960s. Four old mosque pillars found within the mosque are from the 17th century. According to local lore, the original mosque, built in the indigenous sacred Moro pagoda architectural style, was established in 1380, making it the oldest mosque in the Philippines and in Southeast Asia.

== History ==
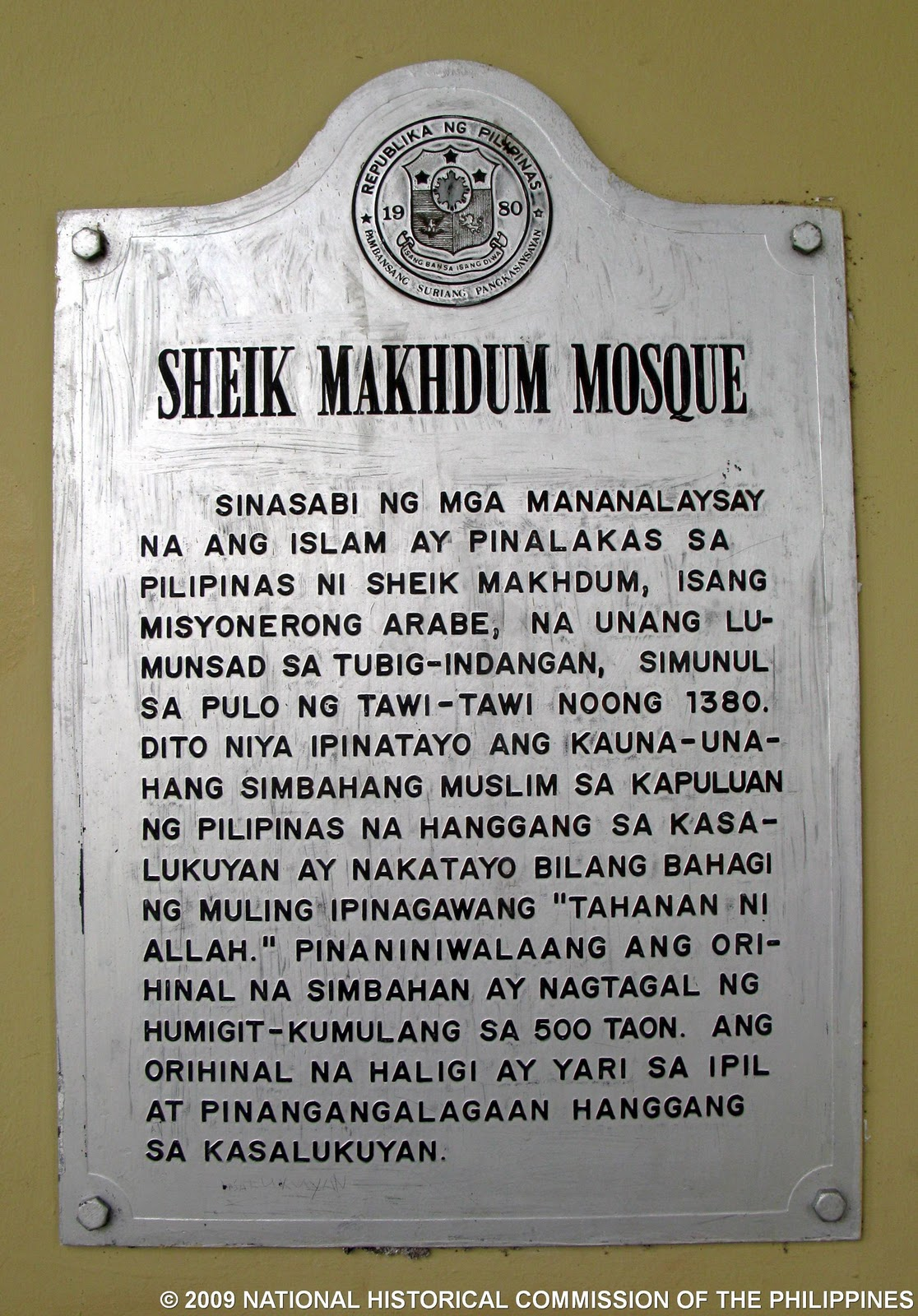
Historical marker installed in 2009

According to local folklore, it was built by a Syrian Arab trader and Sunni Sufi scholar named Sheikh Karimul Makhdum in 1380. The architecture of the original mosque would likely have been the indigenous Moro pagoda-style. Old wooden pillars have been found within the current mosque grounds. Some theorize that the wooden pillars were either the pillars of the original 1380 pagoda mosque, or a later old wooden mosque built centuries after the pagoda mosque was ruined.

Scholarly studies from the National Museum of the Philippines later confirmed that the pillars found within the present mosque date back to the 17th century. The four 17th-century pillars are regarded as sacred as they are at least 400 years old and are the oldest known Islamic artifacts in the entire Philippines.

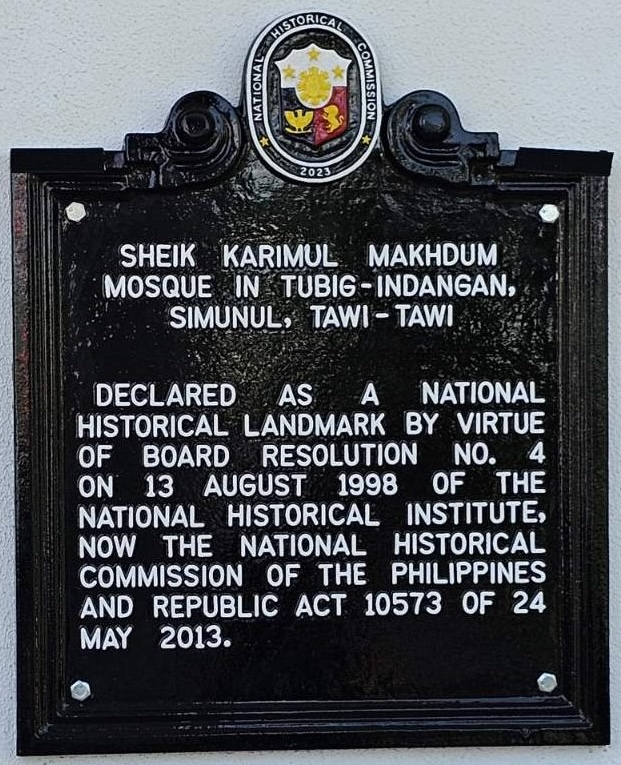
Historical marker stating that the mosque was declared as a National Historical Landmark

The current mosque building was constructed in the 1960s, after most of the prior structure was burned down in 1941 during the Japanese occupation in World War II. The architecture used for the current building was of the Arabic onion-dome style, and not the traditional sacred pagoda style of the Moro people. In recent years, some scholars, leaders, and locals have supported initiatives to rebuild the mosque following their traditional Moro pagoda-style.

== Cultural status ==
The mosque has been declared as a National Historical Landmark by the National Historical Commission and a National Cultural Treasure by the National Museum.

The National Historical Commission of the Philippines (formerly the NHC) unveiled a historical marker at the mosque in November 7, 2023.

== Gallery ==
A different side of the mosque

Northern entrance with historical markers

== See also ==
- Makhdum Karim
- Islam in the Philippines
- List of the oldest mosques
