= Sheikh Karimul Makhdum =

Muslim missionary, Arab Sufi

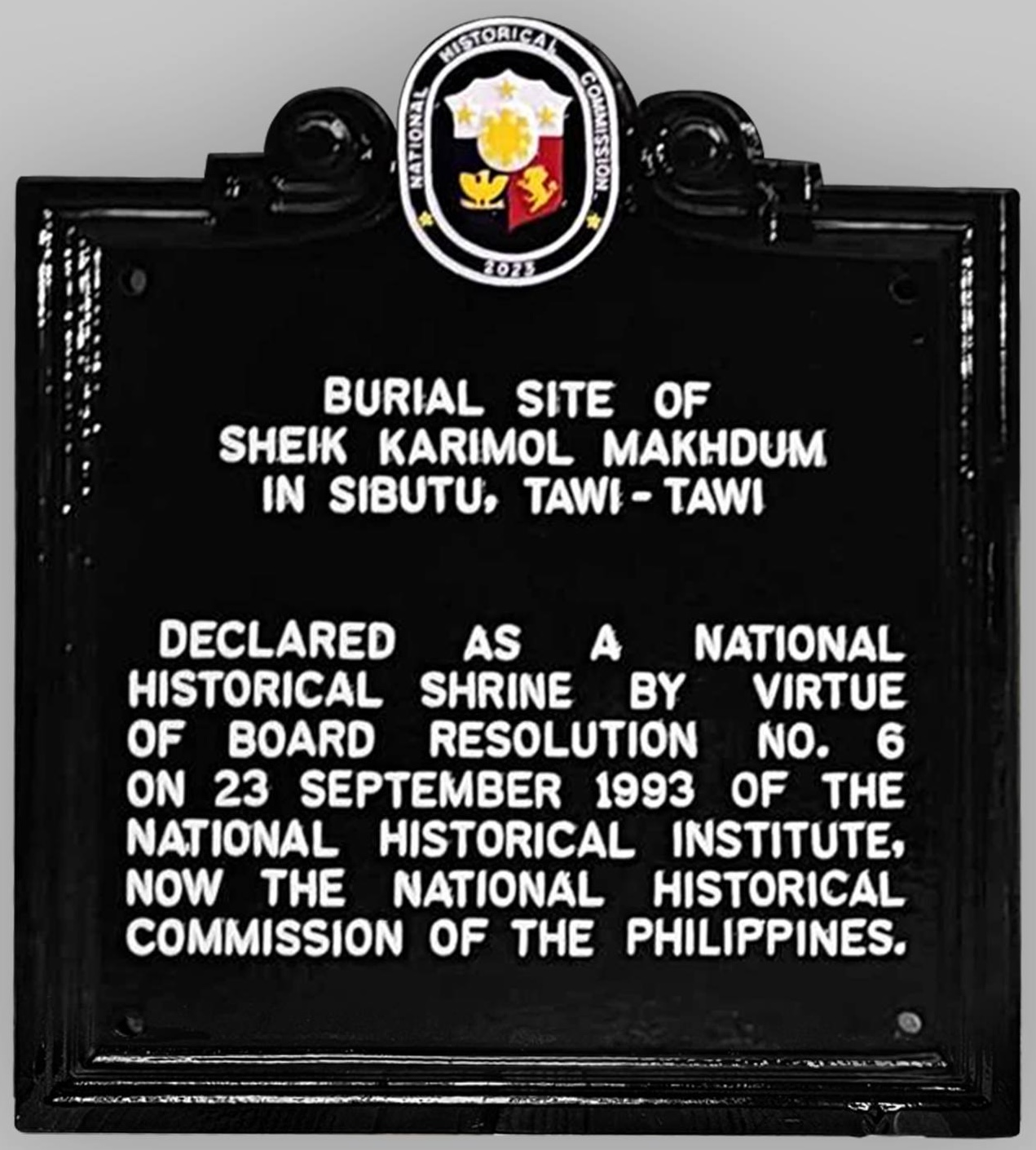
Historical marker installed in 2023 stating that the burial site of Makhdum had been declared as a National Historial Shrine by the National Historical Commission of the Philippines

Sheikh Karimul Makhdum was a Syrian Arab and Sufi Muslim as well as an early missionary who traveled to Maritime Southeast Asia. Karimul Makhdum was born in Makdonia, a village near Damascus in Syria. Him and the Wali Sanga were affiliated with the Kubrawi Hamadani missionaries in the late 14th century. He was a Sufi who brought Islam to the Philippines in 1380, 141 years before Portuguese explorer Ferdinand Magellan arrived in the country. He established a mosque in Simunul Island, Tawi-Tawi, Philippines, known as Sheikh Karimul Makhdum Mosque which is the oldest mosque in the country.

== Commemoration ==
In his honor and to commemorate the introduction of Islam, Sheikh Karim'ul Makhdum Day has been observed throughout the Bangsamoro region as a special public holiday, every November 7 annually. It was first declared by the government of the now-defunct Autonomous Region in Muslim Mindanao in 1991 through Muslim Mindanao Act No. 17 and Executive Order No. 40 (dated November 4). On July 9, 2025, President Bongbong Marcos signed Republic Act No. 12228, designating the same date a special national working holiday.
