= Simunul =

Municipality in Tawi-Tawi, Philippines

Simunul سيمونول
- Municipality
- Municipality of Simunul
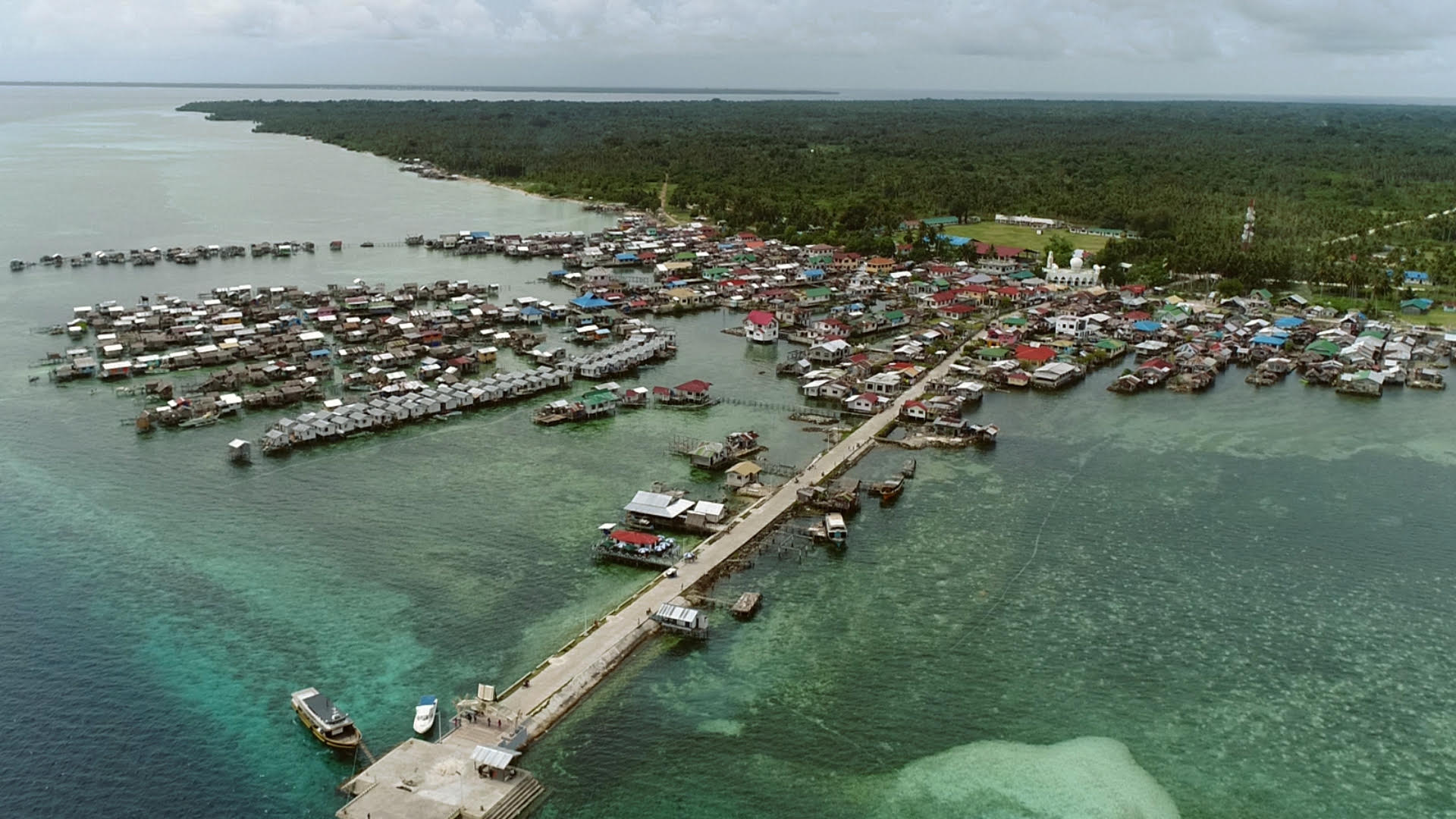
- Aerial view of Simunul in 2018

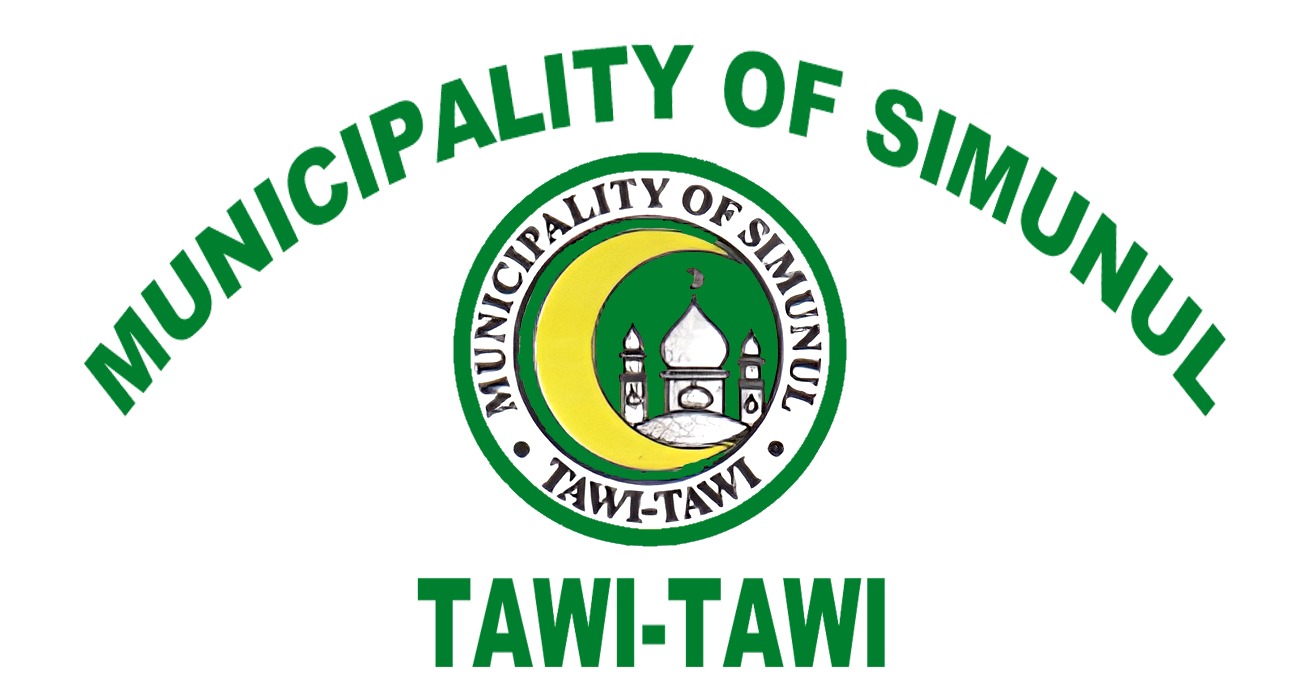
- Flag
- Nickname: The Birthplace of Islam in the Philippines
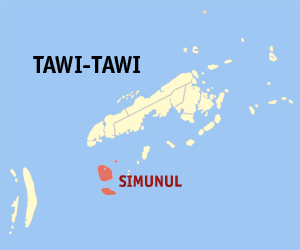
- Map of Tawi-Tawi with Simunul highlighted
- Interactive map of Simunul
- Location within the Philippines
- Coordinates: 4°53′53″N 119°49′17″E
- Country: Philippines
- Region: Bangsamoro Autonomous Region in Muslim Mindanao
- Province: Tawi-Tawi
- House district: Lone district
- Parliamentary district: 3rd district
- Barangays: 15 (see Barangays)

Government
  - Type: Sangguniang Bayan
  - Mayor: Wasilah T. Abdurahman
  - Vice Mayor: Ershad T. Abdurahman
  - House Representative: Dimszar M. Sali
  - Municipal Council: Members: Shere-Dee T. Pianah; Fatima Fayruz L. Manzur; Ismael B. Abdulatip; Abdurahman C. Idris; Jamail I. Elloh Jr.; Ismael A. Abdulhamid; Elaine S. Junaid; Pirza N. Bulante
  - Electorate: 16,619 voters (2025)

Area
  - Total: 167.25 km^{2} (64.58 sq mi)
- Elevation: 1.0 m (3.3 ft)
- Highest elevation: 325 m (1,066 ft)
- Lowest elevation: 0 m (0 ft)

Population (2024 census)
  - Total: 35,616
  - Density: 212.95/km^{2} (551.54/sq mi)
  - Households: 6,100

Economy
  - Income class: 2nd municipal income class
  - Poverty incidence: 34.15% (2023)
  - Revenue: ₱ 171.8 million (2024)
  - Assets: ₱ 224.8 million (2024)
  - Expenditure: ₱ 170.7 million (2024)
  - Liabilities: ₱ 10.71 million (2024)

Service provider
  - Electricity: Tawi Tawi Electric Cooperative (TAWELCO)
- Time zone: UTC+8 (PST)
- ZIP code: 7505
- PSGC: 1907004000
- IDD : area code: +63 (0)68
- Native languages: Sama; Tagalog; Sabah Malay
- Website: www.simunul.gov.ph

Simunul, officially the Municipality of Simunul (Tagalog: Bayan ng Simunul), is a municipality in the province of Tawi-Tawi, Philippines. According to the 2024 census, it has a population of 35,616 people. The majority of the people living here are Muslims.

== History ==
Simunul Island, is the place where the first mosque in the Philippines was built, Sheikh Karimul Makhdum Mosque, a National Historical Landmark of the Philippines.

== Geography ==
The municipality consists of 2 islands: the larger eponymous Simunul Island and Manuk Mangkaw (Manuk Manka) Island, 3.5 kilometres (2.2 mi) to the south. There are six beaches in Simunul.

=== Barangays ===
Simunul is politically subdivided into 15 barangays. Each barangay consists of puroks while some have sitios.

- Bagid
- Bakong
- Doh-Tong
- Luuk Datan
- Manuk Mangkaw
- Maruwa
- Mongkay
- Pagasinan
- Panglima Mastul
- Sokah-Bulan
- Tampakan (Poblacion)
- Timundon
- Tonggusong
- Boheh Indangan
- Ubol

The barangays of Timundon, Manuk Mangkaw, and Luuk Datan are located on Manuk Mangkaw Island; the remaining 12 barangays are located on Simunul Island.

=== Climate ===
Climate data for Simunul, Tawi-Tawi
Month	Jan	Feb	Mar	Apr	May	Jun	Jul	Aug	Sep	Oct	Nov	Dec	Year
Mean daily maximum °C (°F)	29 (84)	29 (84)	29 (84)	30 (86)	30 (86)	30 (86)	29 (84)	30 (86)	30 (86)	30 (86)	29 (84)	29 (84)	30 (85)
Mean daily minimum °C (°F)	25 (77)	24 (75)	24 (75)	25 (77)	25 (77)	25 (77)	25 (77)	25 (77)	25 (77)	25 (77)	25 (77)	25 (77)	25 (77)
Average precipitation mm (inches)	157 (6.2)	115 (4.5)	123 (4.8)	96 (3.8)	136 (5.4)	120 (4.7)	104 (4.1)	89 (3.5)	86 (3.4)	131 (5.2)	151 (5.9)	159 (6.3)	1,467 (57.8)
Average rainy days	20.4	17.5	20.4	21.1	26.7	25.7	26.0	24.5	24.0	27.7	26.3	24.7	285
Source: Meteoblue

== Demographics ==
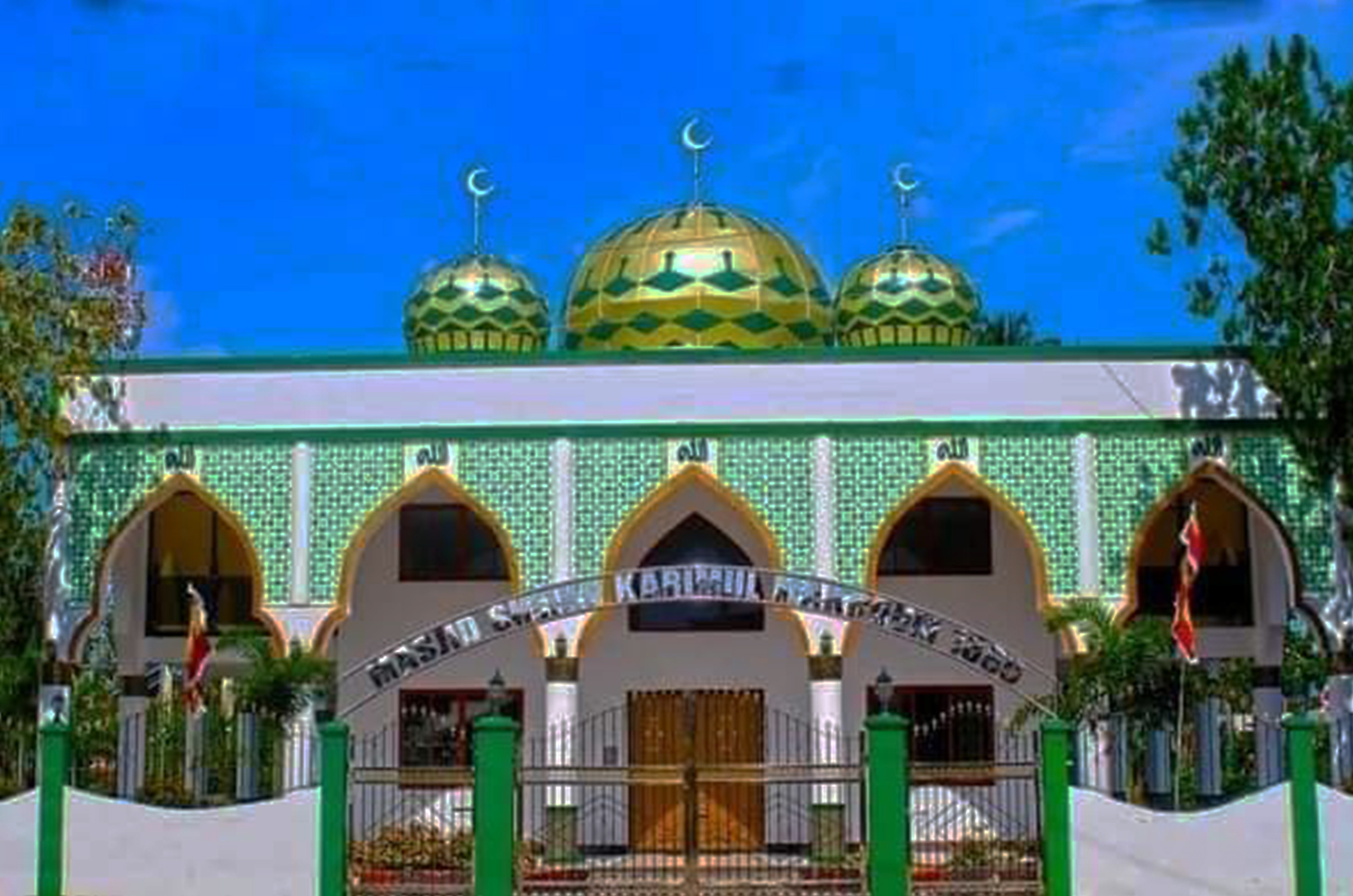
Sheik Karimal Makdum Mosque

Population census of Simunul
Year	Pop.	±% p.a.
1903	1,440	—
1918	5,818	+9.76%
1939	4,980	−0.74%
1948	5,413	+0.93%
1960	8,724	+4.06%
1970	12,135	+3.35%
1975	20,218	+10.78%
1980	26,816	+5.81%
1990	26,491	−0.12%
1995	29,254	+1.88%
2000	31,962	+1.92%
2007	38,239	+2.50%
2010	34,538	−3.64%
2015	31,223	−1.90%
2020	34,245	+1.96%
2024	35,616	+0.95%
Source: Philippine Statistics Authority

The language spoken is Sama, also known as Sinama. The first Muslims in the Philippines are said to have arrived at Simunur. The first mosque in the Philippines was built here by Sheik Karimul Makhdum. This mosque is called the Sheik Karimal Makdum Mosque.

== Economy ==
Poverty Incidence of Simunul

Source: Philippine Statistics Authority
