= List of schools in Bohol =

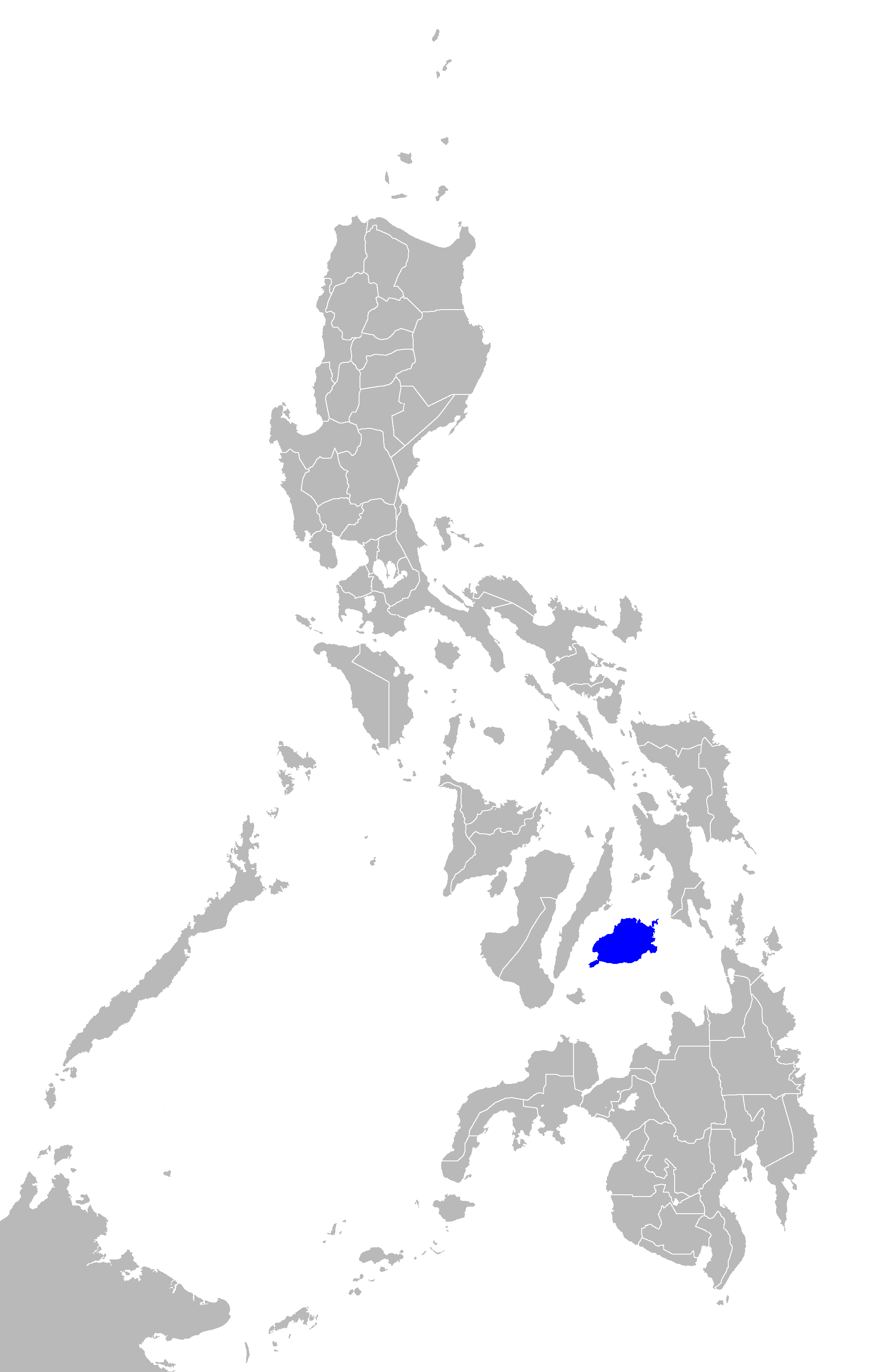
locator map of Bohol

This is a list of schools in Bohol, Philippines.

- Alburquerque:
  - Alburquerque Central Elementary School
  - San Roque National High School, Alburquerque, Bohol
- Alicia:
  - Alicia National High School
  - Blessed Elena Kindergarten School
  - Blessed Trinity Elem. School
  - La Hacienda National High School
- Anda:
  - Anda High School
  - Badiang National High School
  - Candabong National High School
  - Holy Infant Academy
- Antequera:
  - Bantolinao National High School
  - Canlaas High School
  - Christ the King Academy
- Baclayon:
  - Baclayon High School
  - Immaculata High School
- Balilihan:
  - Carmel Academy
  - Cong. Pablo Malazarte Mem. High School
  - Hanopol National High School
- Batuan:
  - Saint Anthony Academy
  - Batuan National High School
  - Batuan Colleges Inc.
  - Rizal High School
  - Quezon High School
  - St. Therese School of Batuan
- Bien Unido:
  - Bien Unido Academy Inc.
  - Hingotangan National High School
  - Holy Child Academy of Bien Unido, Bohol Inc.
  - Pres. Carlos P. Garcia Tech Voc School of Fisheries and Arts
  - Montessori Educational Learning Centre of Ubay, Bien Unido Branch
  - Ponciano L. Padin National High School
  - Nueva Esperanza Integrated School
- Bilar:
  - Bilar National High School
  - Bohol Island State University Bilar Campus
  - Campagao High School
  - Immaculate Mother School of Bilar, Inc.
- Buenavista:
  - Cabulan National High School
  - Cangawa National High School
  - Lubang National High School
- Calape:
  - Bohol Province Institute
  - Fermin Tayabas High School
  - Mayor A. R. Tuazon National School of Fisheries
  - Pangangan National High School Annex
  - Pangangan National High School Main
- Candijay:
  - Anoling High School
  - Candijay High School
  - Central Visayas State College of Agriculture, Fisheries and Technology (CVSCAFT)
  - Cogtong High School
  - La Union National High School
  - St. Joseph Academy
  - Tambongan National High School
- Carmen:
  - Ambassador Pablo R. Suarez, Jr. National High School
  - Francisco Adlaon High School
  - Isabel Gujol Memorial High School
  - Katipunan National High School
  - Policronio S. Dano, Sr. High School
  - St. Anthony Academy
- Catigbian:
  - Catigbian Elementary School Annex
  - Catigbian National High School
  - Holy Infant Academy
  - Immaculate Mary Academy (IMA)
  - Mantacida High School
- Clarin:
  - Clarin School of Fisheries
  - Nahawan National High School
- Corella:
  - Corella National High School
- Cortes:
  - Infant King Academy
  - Fatima National High School
- Dagohoy:
  - Dagohoy National High School
- Danao:
  - Cantubod High School
  - Danao National High School
  - Francisco Dagohoy Memorial High School
  - Taming High School
- Dauis:
  - Biking National High School
  - Dauis High School
  - Tabalong National High School
- Dimiao:
  - Canhayupon National High School
  - Dimiao National High School
  - St. Nicholas Academy
- Duero:
  - Duero National High School
  - Guinsularan National High School
  - Immaculate Academy
- Garcia Hernandez:
  - Garcia Hernandez High School
  - St. John the Baptist Academy
  - Tabuan National High School
  - Catungawan National High School
  - Guinacot National High School
- Getafe:
  - Campao Oriental National High School
  - Handumon High School
  - Sto. Niño Institute
  - Tulang National High School
  - Getafe High School
- Guindulman:
  - Mayuga National High School
  - St. Mary Academy
  - Guinacot National High School
  - Catungawan National High School
- Inabanga:
  - Inabanga High School Nabuad
  - San Jose National High School, Inabanga
  - Southern Inabanga High School
  - St. Paul's Academy
- Jagna:
  - Bohol Institute of Technology
  - Calabacita National High School
  - Central Visayan Institute Foundation
  - Colegio de la Medalla Milagrosa
  - Faraon National High School
  - Jagna High School
  - Lonoy National High School
  - San Miguel Academy
  - Tubod Monte Integrated School
- Lila:
  - Holy Rosary Academy
  - Lila National High School
- Loay:
  - Hinawanan High School
  - Holy Trinity Academy
  - Loay National High School
- Loboc:
  - Camayaan National High School
  - Loboc Academy PMI
  - Loboc National High School
  - Oy High School
- Loon:
  - Cabilao National High School
  - Gov. Jacinto Borja National High School
  - Loon North High School
  - Loon South National High School
  - Lopez-Dano-Simbajon High School
  - Sacred Heart Academy
  - Sandingan National High School
  - St. Teresa Academy
  - University of Bohol Loon Institute
- Mabini:
  - Concepcion National High School
  - San Roque National High School, Mabini, Bohol
  - Sta. Monica Institute
- Maribojoc:
  - Busao National High School
  - Immaculate Mother School Foundation
  - Pagnitoan National High School
  - St. Vincent Institute
- Panglao:
  - Lourdes National High School
  - San Agustin Academy
- Pilar:
  - Pilar National High School
  - San Isidro National High School, Pilar
  - Virgen del Pilar Academy
- Pres. Carlos P. Garcia or Pitogo:
  - Aguining National High School
  - Holy Child Academy
  - Villa Milagrosa High School
- Sagbayan:
  - Canmano High School
  - Japer Memorial School
  - San Agustin National High School
  - St. Augustine Institute
- San Isidro:
  - San Isidro National High School, San Isidro
  - Bugang High School
- San Miguel:
  - Mahayag National High School
  - Mahayag Elementary School
  - San Miguel National High School
  - Bugang National High School
  - Tomoc High School
- Sierra Bullones:
  - Dusita High School
  - Dusita SDA Multigrade School
  - Sierra Bullones Technical Vocational National High School
  - Bugsoc High School
  - Nan-od High School
  - Cahayag Elementary School
  - Anibongan Elementary School
  - Dusita Elementary School
  - Matin-ao Elementary School
  - Danicop Elementary School
  - Casilay Elementary School
  - Magsaysay Elementary School
  - Lataban Elementary School
  - Abachanan Elementary School
  - Bugsoc Elementary School
  - Sierra Bullones Central Elementary School
  - Villa Garcia Elementary School
  - San Agustin Elementary School
- Sikatuna:
  - Sikatuna National High School
- Tagbilaran:
  - BIT International College, formerly the Bohol Institute of Technology or BIT
  - Bohol Deaf Academy
  - Bohol Island State University Main Campus formerly Central Visayas State College of Agriculture, Forestry and Technology (CVSCAFT) Tagbilaran City Campus
  - Bohol Wisdom School (BWS)
  - Cogon Elementary and High School
  - D M L Montessori School
  - Dr. Cecilio Putong National High School, formerly the Bohol National High School (BNHS)
  - Holy Infant School - Tagbilaran
  - Holy Name University, formerly (Divine Word College of Tagbilaran) High School Department
  - Grace Christian School
  - Holy Name University (HNU), formerly the Divine Word College of Tagbilaran (DWC-T)
  - Holy Spirit School or HSS
  - Holy Trinity Foundation School
  - Immaculate Heart of Mary Seminary (IHMS)
  - Manga National High School
  - Mansasa High School
  - Merne Graham Memorial School
  - PMI Colleges Bohol - Tagbilaran City
  - Royal Christian School
  - St. Therese Elementary School - Dampas
  - St. Therese Kindergarten School
  - Tagbilaran City Science High School
  - University of Bohol (UB)
  - Victoriano D. Tirol Advanced Learning Center
- Talibon:
  - Bagacay High School
  - Blessed Trinity College
  - Blessed Trinity High School
  - Bohol Institute of Technology
  - Bohol Maranatha Christian School Maranatha Christian School
  - Calituban High School
  - Pres. Carlos P Garcia Memorial High School, Talibon
  - San Jose National High School, Talibon
  - Sikatuna High School, Talibon
- Trinidad:
  - Hinlayagan National High School
  - Kauswagan National High School Hinlayagan Annex
  - Kinanoan High School
  - St. Isidore Academy
  - Tagum Sur National High School
- Tubigon:
  - Bagongbanwa High School
  - Cahayag National High School
  - Cawayanan National High School
  - Holy Cross Academy
  - Holy Family of Nazareth School
  - Mater Dei College
  - Salus Institute of Technology
  - Tubigon West Central High School
  - Tubigon West National High School
- Ubay:
  - Biabas Trade High School
  - Benliw Apostolic Christian School
  - Bohol Northeastern Colleges
  - Bulilis National High School
  - Cagting High School
  - Camambugan National High School
  - Don Aguedo Reyes Maboloc Memorial National High School
  - Erico Aumentado High School
  - Grace Comprehensive Learning Academy
  - Hambabauran High School
  - Holy Child Academy
  - ICTHUS Christian Academy
  - Montessori Educational Learning Center of Ubay
  - Sacred Heart Learning and Formation Center
  - San Pascual Academy
  - San Pascual National Agricultural High School
  - Tapal Integrated School
  - Tubog Integrated School
  - Ubay Baptist Christian Academy
  - Ubay Seventh-day Adventist Multigrade School
  - Ubay National Science High School
  - Ubay Community College
  - Union National High School
- Valencia:
  - Valencia Technical Vocational High School
  - Mayor Pablo O. Lim Memorial High School

== Note ==
This is copied from the Cebuano Wikipedia.
