= President Garcia =

President Garcia may refer to:

- Carlos P. Garcia (1896–1971), 8th President of the Philippines
- Alan García (1949 – 2019), President of Peru from 1985 to 1990 and from 2006 to 2011
- President Carlos P. Garcia, Bohol, a municipality in the Philippines
