= Tilmubo Island =

Barangay and Islet in Central Visayas, Philippines

Tilmubo Island Pulo sa Tilmubo
- Barangay and Islet
- Barangay Tilmobo
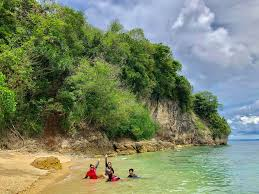
- Tilmubo Island
- Nickname: "El Nido in Pitogo"
- Interactive map of Tilmubo Island
- Location of Tilmubo Island within the Philippines Tilmubo Island (Philippines)
- Coordinates: 10°07′21″N 124°38′35″E
- Country: Philippines
- Region: Central Visayas
- Province: Bohol
- Municipality: President Carlos P. Garcia
- Barangay: Tilmubo

Government
  - Type: Barangay government
  - Mayor (CPG): Fernando Estavilla
  - SK President (CPG): Allen Rey Obligado
  - Barangay Secretary: Margie Bagcat

Area
  - Total: 0.24 km^{2} (0.093 sq mi)
- Elevation: 68 m (223 ft)
- Highest elevation: 79 m (259 ft)
- Lowest elevation: 0 m (0 ft)

Population (2020)
  - Total: 221
  - Density: 920/km^{2} (2,400/sq mi)
- Demonym: Tilmubuan
- IDD : area code: +63 (0)38
- Registered voters: 156 (2023)
- Households: 56 (2020)
- Economy • Poverty incidence36.8% (2021) • Revenue₱628,891.00 (2010)
- Utilities • Electric distributionBOHECO II • Power generationNPC-SPUG
- TimezonePST (UTC+08:00) • Summer (DST)Not observed
- ZIP code6346 PSGC071235019
- Native languages: Boholano; Cebuano

Tilmubo/Tilmobo Island (Cebuano: Pulo sa Tilmubo; Filipino: Pulo ng Tilmubo) is an islet and barangay located in the President Carlos P. Garcia municipality, in the province of Bohol, Philippines. It is situated in the Canigao Channel within the Bohol Sea. (also referred to as the Mindanao Sea) According to the 2020 census, it has a population of 221 people.

== History ==
=== Precolonial era ===
Before the colonial era of the Philippines, Tilmubo Island was inhabited by Austronesian groups. Those groups were organized into barangays led by local chiefs. Extensive maritime trade networks and animistic beliefs were practiced by the early inhabitants.

=== Political evolution ===
For most of the 20th century, Tilmubo Island was under the administrative jurisdiction of the municipality of Ubay. The island was incorporated into the newly established municipality of Pitogo on June 21, 1969 through Republic Act No. 5864. The municipality was later renamed President Carlos P. Garcia in 1977 to honor the eighth president of the Philippines.

== Geography ==
=== Location ===
Tilmubo Island is a small islet situated in the Central Visayas. It is located in the Canigao Channel. To the south, the Bohol Sea borders the island. Tilmubo Island is part of the municipality of President Carlos P. Garcia.

=== Physical features ===
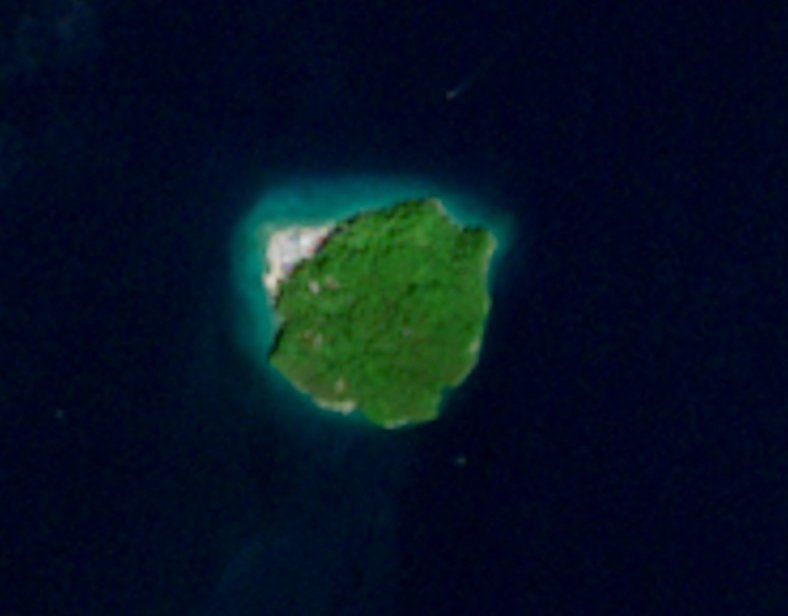
Aerial view of Tilmubo Island

The island's land area is approximately 0.24 square kilometers, and features terrain consisting primarily of coralline limestone. The maximum elevation of Tilmubo Island reaches 79 meters (259 feet) above sea level. Clear tropical waters, coral reefs, and seagrass beds characterize the coast line.

=== Climate ===
The climate of Tilmubo Island is tropical maritime. Throughout the year, there is rainfall distribution, and high humidity levels.

Climate data for Tilmubo Island, President Carlos P. Garcia, Bohol
Month	Jan	Feb	Mar	Apr	May	Jun	Jul	Aug	Sep	Oct	Nov	Dec	Year
Mean daily maximum °C (°F)	28 (82)	28 (82)	29 (84)	31 (88)	31 (88)	30 (86)	30 (86)	30 (86)	30 (86)	29 (84)	29 (84)	28 (82)	29 (85)
Mean daily minimum °C (°F)	23 (73)	23 (73)	23 (73)	23 (73)	24 (75)	24 (75)	24 (75)	24 (75)	24 (75)	24 (75)	24 (75)	23 (73)	24 (74)
Average precipitation mm (inches)	98 (3.9)	82 (3.2)	96 (3.8)	71 (2.8)	104 (4.1)	129 (5.1)	101 (4.0)	94 (3.7)	99 (3.9)	135 (5.3)	174 (6.9)	143 (5.6)	1,326 (52.3)
Average precipitation days (≥ 1.0)	18.0	14.1	17.1	16.8	23.7	25.7	25.8	23.3	24.2	25.9	24.0	20.6	259.2
Source: Meteoblue

== Demographics ==
Population census of Tilmubo Island
Year	Pop.	±%
1990	348	—
1995	249	−28.4%
2000	266	+6.8%
2007	259	−2.6%
2010	197	−23.9%
2015	202	+2.5%
2020	221	+9.4%
Source: Philippine Statistics Authority

== Economy ==
% vertical bar chart of Poverty incidence of Tilmubo Island between 2000 and 2021
Source: Philippine Statistics Authority

== Education ==
Tilmobo Elementary School (DepEd School ID: 118605) is the sole educational facility on Tilmubo Island. The institution is under the jurisdiction of the Department of Education Schools Division of Bohol. Primary education is provided by the school for the residents of the island. Since secondary education is not provided on the island, students must travel to the mainland of the municipality of President Carlos P. Garcia to attend other schools.

=== Elementary schools ===
- Tilmobo Elementary School

== See also ==
- President Carlos P. Garcia, Bohol
- Bohol
- Central Visayas
- Philippines
