= Bohol Northern Star Colleges =

Private college in Bohol, Philippines

- Pamantasan ng Hilagang Bituin ng Bohol (Filipino)
- Other names: BNSC, BNEF
- Motto: Educated Minds, Noble Hearts, Helpful Hands
- Type: Private, non-sectarian, non-profit
- Established: January 23, 2007
- Academic affiliations: CHED
- President: Amalia R. Tirol, Ph.D.
- Location: Isaac Garces Street, Poblacion, Ubay, Bohol, 6315, Philippines; 10°02′59″N 124°27′59″E
- Campus: Urban
- Language: English, Filipino
- Colors: Royal blue and white
- Website: boholnorthernstar.net
- Location in the Visayas Location in the Philippines

The Bohol Northern Star Colleges or BNSC is a private non-sectarian co-educational institution of higher learning in Ubay, Bohol, Philippines. The institution is located at barangay Poblacion near the Catholic Cemetery.

It was established as the Bohol Northeastern Colleges in 1996. It is the only surviving college to be established in the municipality of Ubay.

== Course offerings ==
=== Undergraduate courses ===
- Bachelor in Elementary Education
- Bachelor in Secondary Education, major in:
  - English
  - Mathematics
- Bachelor of Science in Accountancy (BSA)
- Bachelor of Science in Accounting Technology (BSAct)
- Bachelor of Science in Business Administration (BSBA), major in:
  - Financial Management
  - Marketing Management
  - Management Accounting
- Bachelor of Science in criminology (BSCrim)
- Bachelor of Science in entrepreneurship (BSE)
- Bachelor of Science in Hotel & Restaurant Management (BSHRM)
- Bachelor of Science in Information Technology (BSIT)
- Bachelor of Science in Information System (BSIS)
- Bachelor of Arts (AB), major in:
  - Political Science
  - Psychology
- Continuing Professional Education (CPE)

=== Associate diplomas ===
- Diploma in Industrial Technology, major in:
  - Automotive
  - Electricity
  - Electronics
- Diploma in Technology Education, major in:
  - Automotive
  - Electricity
  - Electronics

=== TESDA WTR registered programs ===
- Automotive Servicing NC-II
- Building Wiring Installation NC-II
- Consumer Electronic Servicing NC-II
- Computer Hardware Servicing NC-II
- Tourism (ladderized to BSHRM)
- Front Office Services NC-II
- Commercial Cooking NC-II
- Baking/Pastry Production
- Housekeeping NC-II
- Bartending NC-II
- Shielded Metal Arc Welding NC-II
- Gas Metal Arc Welding NC-II

=== Basic education ===
Bohol Northeastern Education Foundation

- Complete Elementary
- Complete High School
