= Tagbilaran City Science High School =

Public high school in Bohol, Philippines

Location
- Miguel Parras Ext., Tagbilaran City, 6300 Bohol; Tagbilaran City, Bohol; Philippines
- Coordinates: 9°38′18″N 123°51′52″E

Information
- Type: Public, Special Science
- Established: June 1995
- Principal: Mrs. Grace Marie L. Campos
- Head teacher: Mr. Aljon S. Fronteras
- Grades: 7 to 12
- Language: English, Filipino, French
- Campus: 1.3 hectares
- Slogan: Where Great Minds Meet
- Nickname: TCSHS, TSCI, SciHi, Science High
- Publication: The Equinox
- Affiliations: Division of City Schools - Tagbilaran City
- Website: None

Tagbilaran City Science High School (Filipino: Mataas na Paaralang Pang-Agham ng Tagbilaran) is a special-science secondary school under the City Schools Division of Tagbilaran City in the Philippines. It is the first science high school established in Bohol. The other science secondary school is located in Ubay.

== History ==
The Tagbilaran City Science High School was established in June 1995. The City Government had donated a parcel of land along M. Parras Extension which became the present-day site of the school.

== The Campus ==
The school is composed of 15 academic classrooms, 1 science laboratory room, 2 computer laboratory rooms, a library, an amphitheater, a canteen, an administration building, a clinic, 13 toilets and a concrete-paved covered court.

The campus is located beside City East Elementary School. It has a total land area of 12,588 square meters.

Currently, there is a building construction at the back of the school for additional classrooms for Gr. 11 and Gr.12.

== Curriculum ==
The school offers a special secondary science curriculum and STEM for the Senior High School (BEC) of the Department of Education (DepEd) with additional subjects in Science, Mathematics, Technology and Language (currently in French). The school also offers Senior High School.

== Notable Students ==
- Rich Asuncion, actress
- Vivoree Esclito, actress
