= San Pascual Academy =

Roman Catholic high school in Bohol, Philippines

Location
- National Highway, San Pascual; Ubay, Bohol 6315; Philippines
- Coordinates: 9°58′2.46″N 124°25′48.83″E

Information
- School type: Private, Catholic
- Established: 1968
- Sister school: Holy Child Academy - Ubay
- School district: 2nd District of Bohol
- Director: Rev. Fr. Noel Abregana
- Principal: Sr. Ma. Ernanita P. Mindajao, DST
- Faculty: 13
- Grades: 7 to 12
- Enrollment: 500 - 600
- Language: English, Filipino
- Campus: Urban
- Colors: Blue and White
- Nickname: SPA
- Affiliations: DepED - Division of Bohol; Bohol Association of Catholic Schools
- Website: San Pascual Academy

San Pascual Academy is a Catholic and private high school located in barangay San Pascual, Ubay, in the province of Bohol, Philippines. Established in 1968, it became the second Catholic high school in the municipality of Ubay. The other one being, the Holy Child Academy which is located in barangay Poblacion. St. Vincent Ferrer Parish Church is just beside the school and supervised the institution.
