= Ubay, Bohol =

Municipality in Bohol, Philippines

Ubay
- Municipality
- Municipality of Ubay
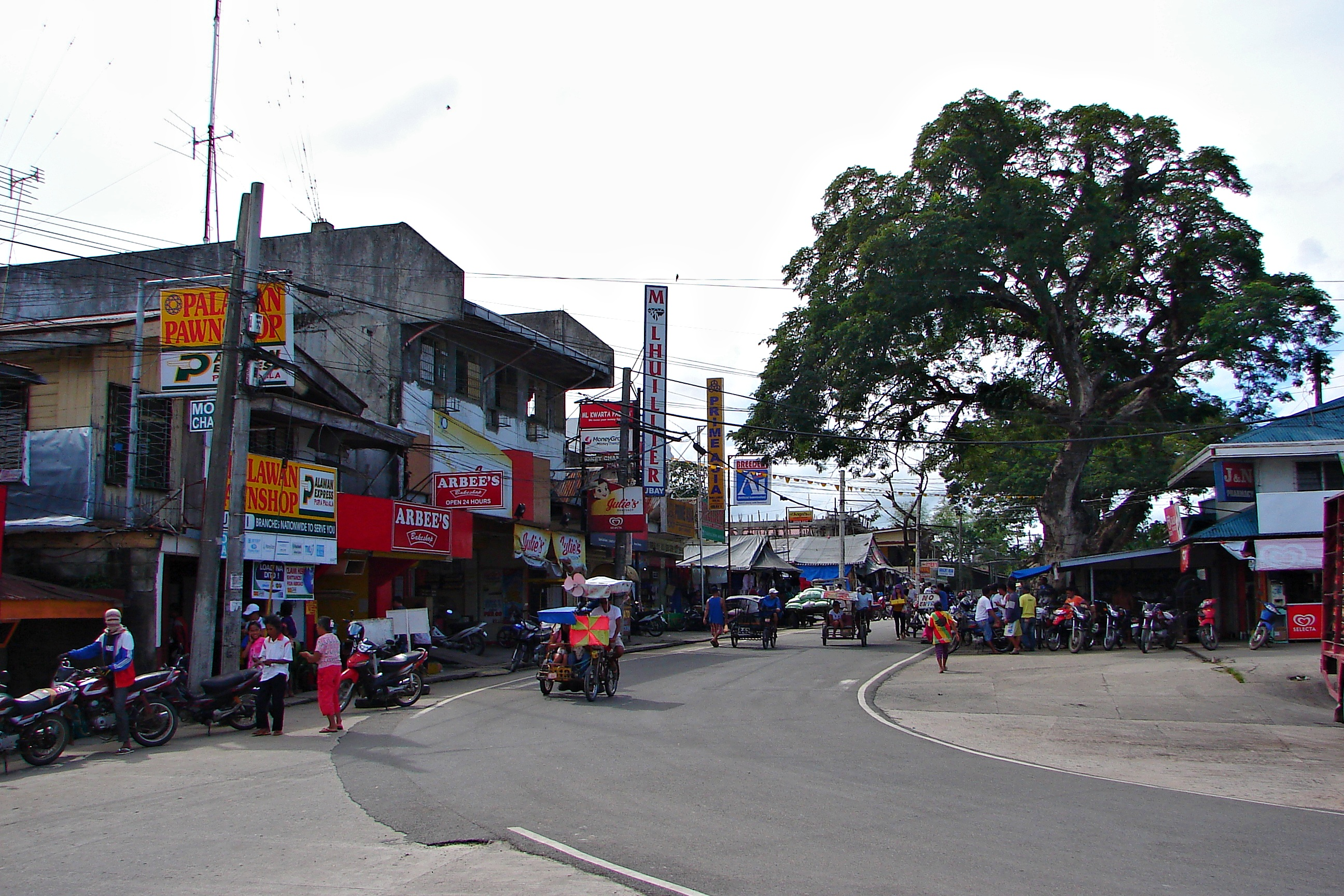

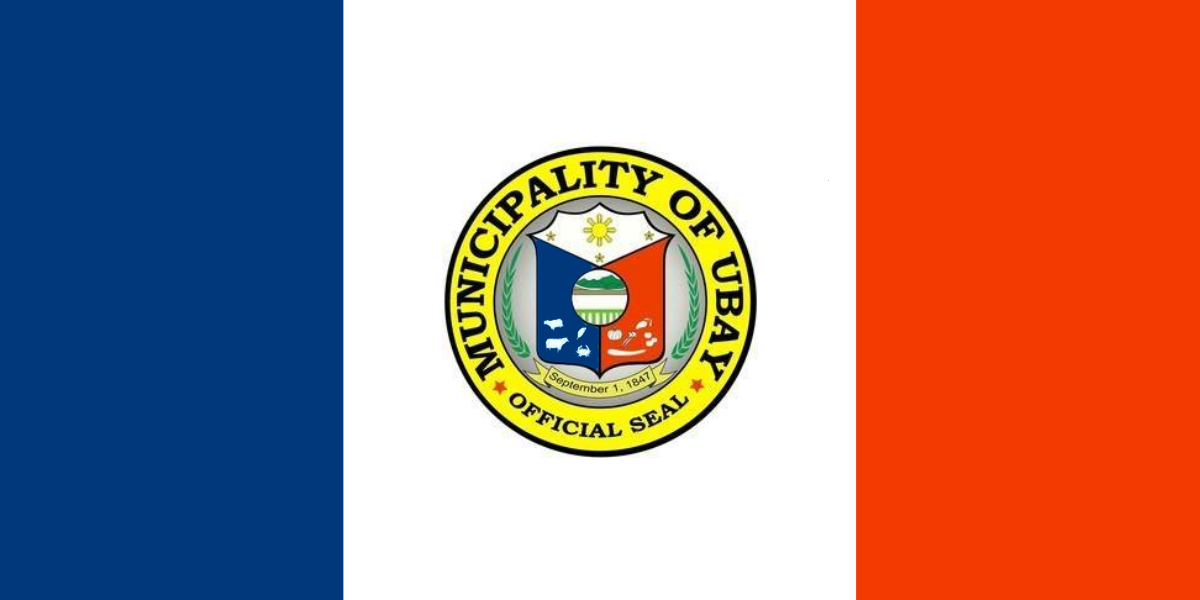
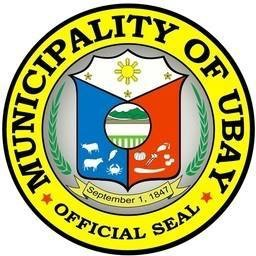
- Flag Seal
- Nickname: Dairy Capital of Bohol
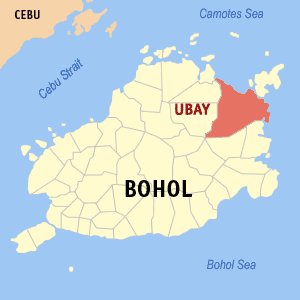
- Map of Bohol with Ubay highlighted
- Interactive map of Ubay
- Location within the Philippines
- Coordinates: 10°03′22″N 124°28′23″E
- Country: Philippines
- Region: Central Visayas
- Province: Bohol
- District: 2nd district
- Founded Chartered: 1821
- Barangays: 44 (see Barangays)

Government
  - Type: Sangguniang Bayan
  - Mayor: Constantino H. Reyes
  - Vice Mayor: Victor A. Bonghanoy
  - Representative: Ma. Vanessa C. Aumentado
  - Municipal Council: Members: Maximo O. Boyles Jr.; Isidore G. Besas; Elvira Bacolod-Cajes; Violeta D. Reyes; Luis M. Rotol; Constancio V. Atuel; Christopher O. Villadores; Nador A. Vallecera
  - Electorate: 53,114 voters (2025)

Area
  - Land: 258.1328 km^{2} (99.6656 sq mi)
- Elevation: 14 m (46 ft)
- Highest elevation: 171 m (561 ft)
- Lowest elevation: 0 m (0 ft)

Population (2024 census)
  - Total: 82,179
  - Density: 318.36/km^{2} (824.55/sq mi)
  - Households: 19,299

Economy
  - Income class: 1st municipal income class
  - Poverty incidence: 21.57% (2023)
  - Revenue: ₱ 499.8 million (2024)
  - Assets: ₱ 947.5 million (2024)
  - Expenditure: ₱ 464 million (2024)
  - Liabilities: ₱ 110.4 million (2024)

Service provider
  - Electricity: Bohol 2 Electric Cooperative (BOHECO 2)
- Time zone: UTC+8 (PST)
- ZIP code: 6315
- PSGC: 071246000
- IDD : area code: +63 (0)38
- Native languages: Cebuano; Boholano dialect Tagalog
- Patron saint: Christ Child

Ubay, officially the Municipality of Ubay (Cebuano: Munisipyo sa Ubay; Tagalog: Bayan ng Ubay), is a municipality in the province of Bohol, Philippines. According to the 2024 census, it has a population of 82,179 people.

Ubay has an uncontested area of 258.132847 square kilometers (25,813.2847 hectares) and has a contested area of 5.87 square kilometers (587.8688 hectares) with other Municipality per certification issued by the Land Management Bureau(LMB) of the DENR. It has a 61-kilometer (38 mi) coastline.

== Etymology ==
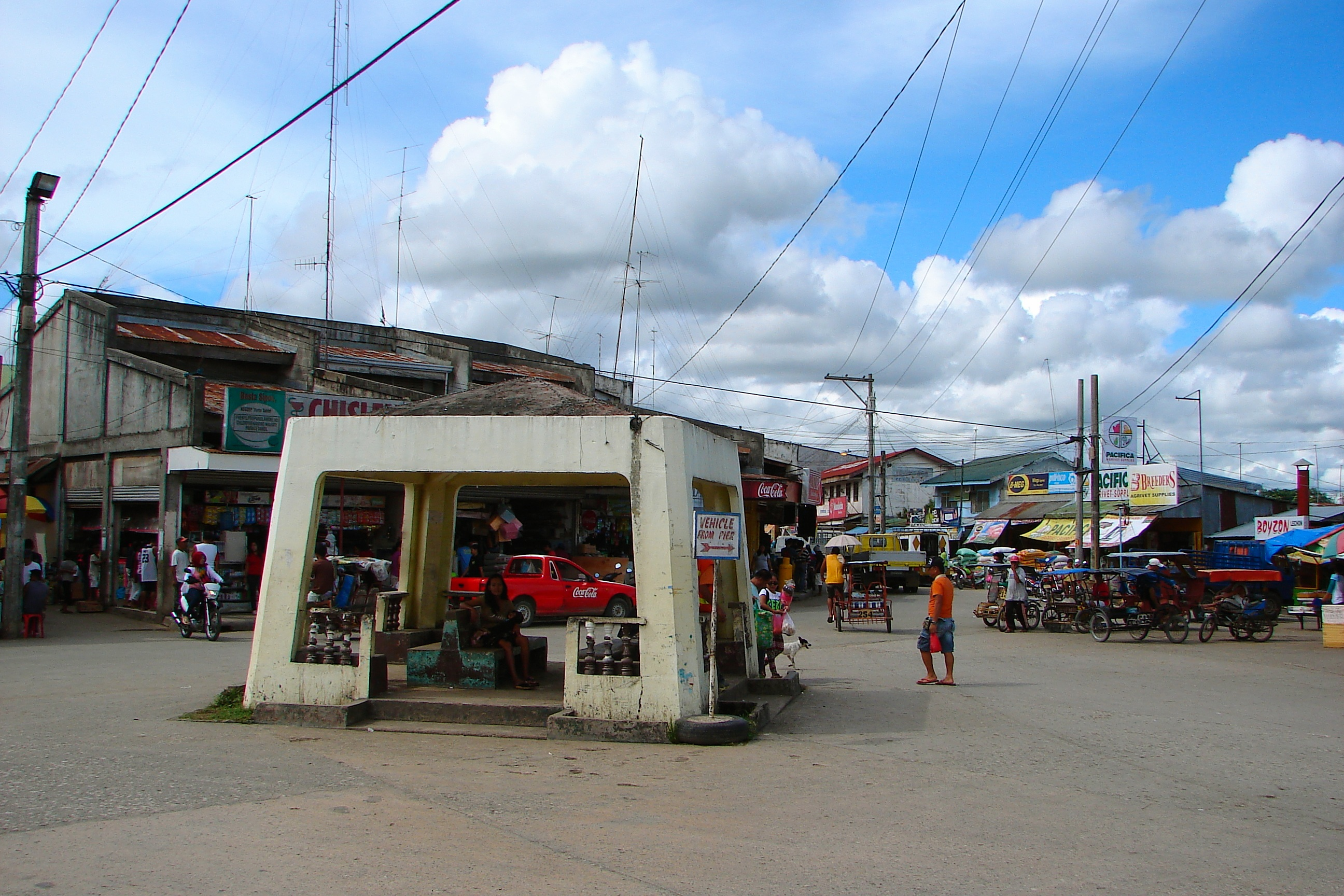
Poblacion area

One etymology derivation is that the town's name is a contraction of the term ubay-ubay, meaning "alongside".

According to Kaufmann's Visayan-English dictionary, the Visayan word "ubay" means:

1. to accompany other in bed or along the side, be they persons or animals;
2. the flow of rivers and streams. from one place to another.

The flow of seawater between the mainland and the island of Lapinig Grande (now Pres. C.P. Garcia town) could justify the second definition of Ubay. It is a situation that is permanent and the constant reference to the flow of water can make the term ubay be attached as the name of the place.

An alternative derivation is that the term 'ubay-ubay' or 'alongside' became the byword of seafarers who used to travel close to the shorelines of Ubay to avoid the strong current of the Canigao Channel. There was a single path to follow reach the island trading centres. This trail was located alongside (ubay) the sandy beach. Later on the term Ubay became the original name of the community.

== History ==
=== Spanish Period ===
Historically, Ubay was part of Talibon, when the latter was established as a town in civil aspect in 1722. During Spanish period, a town has two aspects - religious, headed by the parish priest and civil aspect, headed by a gobernadorcillo. The religious aspect was then considered superior to the civil aspect, as the church held significant influence over daily life and governance during that time.

In 1744, the Dagohoy Revolution started, controlling the entire northeastern part of the province, stretching from Duero to Inabanga that lasted up until 1829. As the revolution progresses, Jesuit were replaced by Augustinian Recollects in Bohol in 1768 led by Fr. Pedro de Santa Barbara, who travelled through mountains with proposals of peace and resettlement for Dagohoy and its followers. Through his untiring intrepidness, later on, pacified patriots together with their cluster chieftains chose to resettle in southern coastal towns. Later in 1794, Fr. Manuel de la Consolacion, then parish priest of Inabanga, successfully brought hundreds of followers and resettled them in towns of Talibon and Inabanga, as well in the barangays (villages) of San Pedro (Talibon), Pangpang (Buenavista), and Ubay. Therefore, much of early residents of Ubay were followers of Dagohoy.

In 1821, Ubay became an independent town from Talibon in civil aspect, but due to the Dagohoy Revolution, the newly established town of Ubay did not operate as an independent town because most of the inhabitants resisted the Spanish Government. Up until 1846, Ubay was not listed among the towns in the island of Bohol. Then, according to a Tax Census dated September 1, 1847, Ubay was officially listed, which served as the basis for its reorganization and indication of a functioning town, marking September 1, 1847 as the foundation date of Ubay. The first gobernadorcillo of Ubay was believed to be Toribio Reyes, whose name and the year 1872 are inscribed on one of the old church bells of Ubay Parish (Parroquia de Ubay), and who was the only son of Berudja, the legendary matriarch of Ubay.

The religious aspect of Ubay was still administered by the parish of Inabanga, until Talibon was able to establish a separate parish in 1831, making Ubay a visita with its chapel made of wood. The official religious aspect of the town was established much later than the civil aspect.

On June 26, 1874, a written petition was made by gobernadorcillo Saturnino Boyles along with the Community Heads, and the Household Heads of Ubay for an independent parish, separate from Talibon. To support their cause, they voluntarily constructed a decent rectory.

Then, on October 22, 1877, an independent parish in Ubay (Spanish Era: Parroquia de Ubay, Present: Santo Niño de Ubay Parish) was established by a diocesan decree under the patronage of the Holy Child. This was done through Royal Order No. 695 of the Ministry of Overseas dated October 5, 1876, issued by the King of Spain Alfonso XII, creating an independent parish in Ubay, and a confirming decree dated November 22, 1876 from the Spanish Governor General José Malcampo, 3rd Marquess of San Rafael. Cabulao (presently San Roque, Mabini) was included as its visita.

The first parish priest of Parrioquia de Ubay (presently Santo Niño de Ubay) was P. Fr. Blas Adan del Pilar, from the Order of Augustinian Recollects, who served from October 1877 until February 1884, before he was transferred to Consolacion, Cebu. He succeeded by P. Fr. Benito Garayao del Carmen, from February 1884 - February 1886; P. Fr. Franscisco Vega de la Virgen de Vico from November 9, 1884, to April 1890; P. Fr. Leon Inchausti del Rosario from February 26 - March 20, 1890; P.Fr. Buenaventura Marrodan del Carmen from March 20, 1890, to 1897; and P. Fr. Juan Bea de la Virgen del Villar, from May 14, 1897, to December 20, 1898.

Ubay holds its town fiesta every January, as it is the official feast month of Santo Niño, a tradition that continues to this day. Ubayanons far away often come home during the fiesta to celebrate, reunite with loved ones, and honor their cultural heritage. The town comes alive with parades, music, and religious services, as the community gathers to relive traditions and strengthen their ties to home.

=== American Rule ===
On March 6, 1902, the entire municipality of Batuanan (now Alicia) was consolidated with Ubay through Philippine Commission Act No. 370

On October 31, 1903, the old municipality of Ipil (now Trinidad) was divided into two. With Ipil River as demarcation line, the left bank was annexed to Talibon while the right bank was consolidated with Ubay. Furthermore, barangay Cabulao and the previously annexed municipality of Batuanan was separated from Ubay, together with barangay Libas, Candijay to create the new and distinct municipality of Mabini in virtue of Philippine Commission Act No. 968.

=== Modern Period ===
On September 1, 1947, the municipality of Ipil was reorganized, joining the barangays of Guinobatan, Mahagbu, and Tagum from Ubay together with other barangays of Talibon to create the renamed municipality of Trinidad through Executive Order No. 80.

On June 21, 1956, barangay Babag separated from Ubay together with other barangays of Carmen, Sierra-Bullones, and Trinidad to form the new municipality of Dagohoy through Executive Order No. 184.

On March 14, 1961, barangays of Corazon and Magsaysay separated from Ubay together with other barangays of Trinidad to form the independent municipality of San Miguel through Executive Order No. 423.

On December 29, 1961, barangay San Isidro (not the present San Isidro, Ubay) separated from Ubay, together with other barangays of Candijay, Guindulman, and Sierra-Bullones to create the municipality of Pilar through Executive Order No. 460.

On June 21, 1969, barangays of Aguining, Basiao, Bonbonon, Gaus, Pitogo, and Tugas separated from Ubay to create the independent municipality of Pitogo in virtue of Republic Act 5867. It was later renamed President Carlos P. Garcia in honor of the 8th president of the Philippines on October 27, 1977, through Presidential Decree No. 1228.

=== Former Territories ===
Ubay is the largest municipality of Bohol with a total land area of 258.13 km^{2}, encompassing about 5.35% of the total land area of the province. In 1902, during the American Colonial period, Ubay covered almost the entire northeast portion of the province, about a fifth of its total land area. Below is the list of former territories under the jurisdiction of Ubay.

Former Territories of Ubay
Name	Current Name	Notes
Babag	Babag, Dagohoy	until June 21, 1956
Banlas	Concepcion, Mabini	listed as one of barrios of Ubay in 1903 Philippine Census
Banlas	Tambo, Mabini	former sitio of Banlas
Batuanan	Alicia, Bohol	from March 6, 1902 - October 31, 1903
Bayongan	Bayongan, San Miguel	established in 1906, joined Trinidad in 1952, and finally annexed to San Miguel on March 14, 1961.
Bugang	Bugang, San Miguel	annexed to Trinidad in 1952 and finally consolidated with San Miguel on March 14, 1961.
Cabulao	San Roque, Mabini	until October 31, 1903
Cabulao	Abad Santos, Mabini	former sitio known as Canlarot
Cabulao	Del Mar, Mabini	former sitio known as Bitaug
Cabulao	San Rafael, Mabini	former sitio known as Benit Uno
Cabulao	San Isidro, Mabini	former sitio known as Tabunoc
Cabulao	Valaga, Mabini	former sitio known as Benit Dos
Cambangay Norte	Cambangay Norte, San Miguel	established 1916, joined Trinidad in 1952, and finally transferred to San Miguel on March 14, 1961.
Cambangay Norte	Manuel Roxas, Trinidad	until September 1, 1947
Catoogan	Catoogan, Trinidad	until August 1952 former sitio of Camambugan until 1924
Corazon	Corazon, San Miguel	until March 14, 1961
Guinobatan	Guinobatan, Trinidad	until September 1, 1947
Guinobatan	La Union, Trinidad	formed after the union of sitios Cambanha, Calunasan, Fatima, and Singgawan
Lungsoda-an	Lungsoda-an, Mabini	formerly known as Quilim, listed as one of barrios of Ubay in 1903 Philippine Census
Lungsoda-an	Baybayon, Mabini	former sitio known as Pooc
Lungsoda-an	Marcelo, Mabini	former sitio known as Bowangan
Magsaysay	Santo Niño, San Miguel	until March 14, 1961
Mahagbu	Mahagbu, Trinidad	until September 1, 1947
Ondol	San Jose, Mabini	until October 31, 1903
Ondol	Paraiso, Mabini	former sitio known as Honongan
Pitogo	President Carlos P. Garcia, Bohol	until June 21, 1969
San Isidro	San Isidro, Pilar	until December 29, 1961
San Isidro	La Suerte, Pilar	former sitio of San Isidro
Soom	Soom, Trinidad	former sitio of Camambugan until 1952.
Tagum	Tagum Norte, Trinidad	until September 1, 1947
Tagum	Tagum Sur, Trinidad	until September 1, 1947
Tagum	La Victoria, Trinidad	formerly known sitio as Bucawi
Tagum	Liberty, Bien Unido	former sitio of Tagum, and annexed to Bien Unido in 1981

== Geography ==
Ubay is the largest and most populated municipality in Bohol, located in the northeast of the province. The town is situated east of Trinidad, north of Alicia and Mabini, and northeast of San Miguel. It is 130 kilometres (81 mi) northeast of Tagbilaran.

=== Climate ===
Ubay Average annual temperature in Ubay is 27·2°C Humidity 75–85%

Climate chart (precipitation, max. and min. temperature)
J	F	M	A	M	J	J	A	S	O	N	D
191 30 22	111 30 22	94 31 23	58 32 23	106 33 24	154 32 24	210 32 24	159 32 24	186 32 24	204 31 23	222 31 23	192 30 23
- █ Average max. and min. temperatures in °C
- █ Precipitation totals in mm
- Source: Climate: Ubay
Imperial conversion
J	F	M	A	M	J	J	A	S	O	N	D
7.5 86 72	4.4 86 72	3.7 88 73	2.3 89 74	4.2 91 75	6.1 90 74	8.3 89 75	6.3 89 75	7.3 89 74	8 89 74	8.7 88 74	7.6 87 73
- █ Average max. and min. temperatures in °F
- █ Precipitation totals in inches

The climate is typically equatorial – temperature range over the year is less than three degrees Celsius (5.4 deg F), and annual rainfall exceeds 1,500 millimetres (59 in). The dry season starts in February and lasts through April sometimes extending to mid‑May. The climate in Ubay falls within Coronas climate type IV, characterized by not very pronounced maximum rainfall with a short dry season from one to three months and a wet season of nine to ten months.

Ubay has a tropical climate. Most months of the year are marked by significant precipitation, making agriculture favorable – it supports at least two rice crops per year. The short dry season has little impact. Ubay is classified as Am (Tropical monsoon climate) by Köppen–Geiger climate classification system.

=== Barangays ===
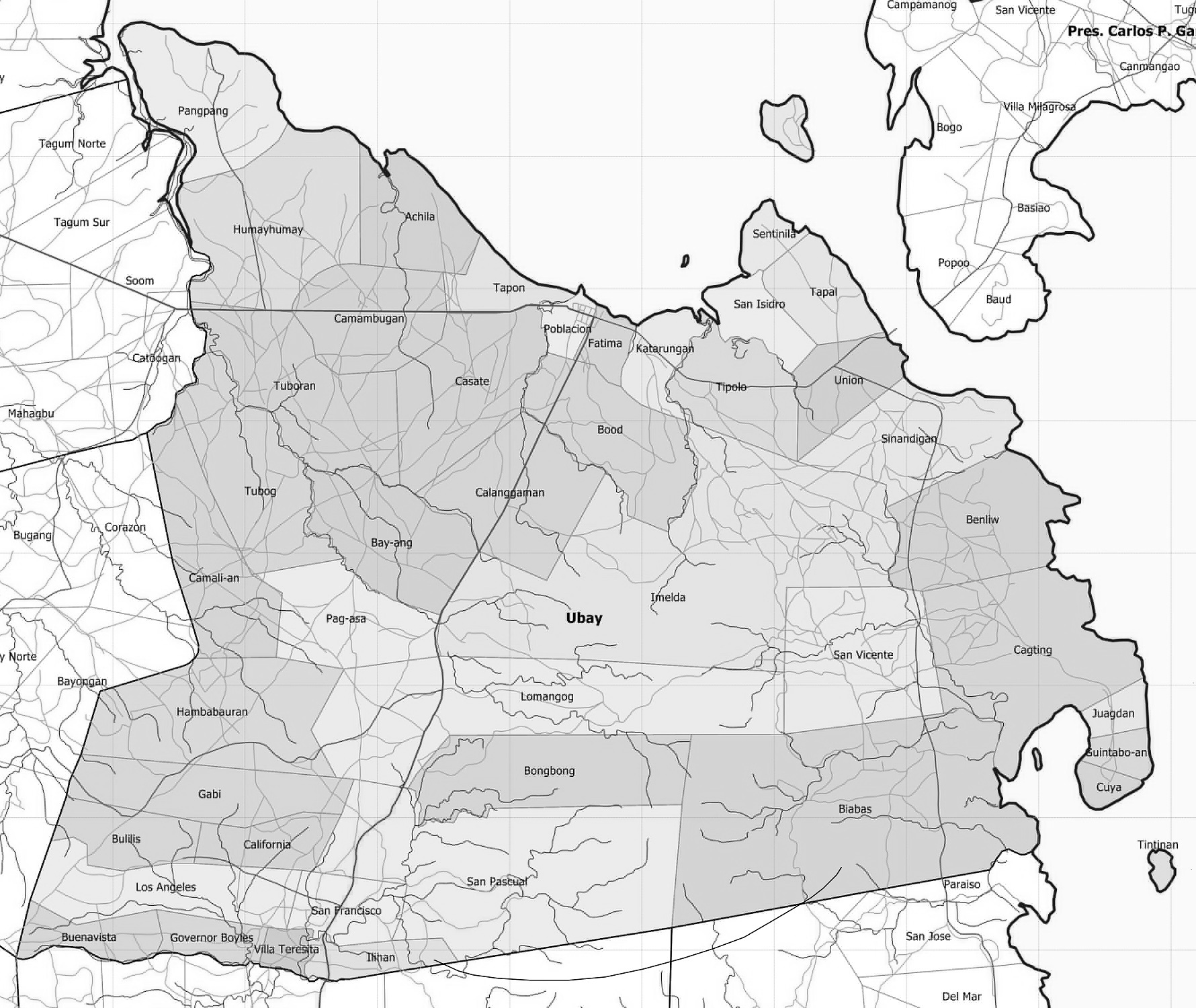
Map of Ubay showing barangays and islands

Ubay is politically subdivided into 44 barangays (villages). Each barangay consists of puroks and some have sitios.

These barangays are organized into eight urban districts (UD):

PSGC	Barangay	Population			±% p.a.		Area		PD 2024		UD	Date of Fiesta
		2024		2010			ha	acre	/km^{2}	/sq mi		
071246001	Achila	1.7%	1,429	1,276	▴	0.79%	384	949	370	960	IV	15 January
071246002	Bay‑ang	2.3%	1,906	1,656	▴	0.98%	632	1,562	300	780	III	21 May
071246005	Benliw	2.7%	2,193	2,223	▾	−0.09%	589	1,455	370	960	VII	13 May
071246004	Biabas	3.2%	2,599	2,573	▴	0.07%	2,200	5,436	120	310	VIII	17 May
071246007	Bongbong	1.1%	895	807	▴	0.72%	161	398	560	1,400	II	8 December
071246008	Bood	3.4%	2,833	2,717	▴	0.29%	152	376	1,900	4,800	V	15 January
071246009	Buenavista	0.9%	709	688	▴	0.21%	651	1,609	110	280	I	Last Saturday of April 26 Apr 2025; 25 Apr 2026; 24 Apr 2027
071246055	Bulilis	2.5%	2,046	1,711	▴	1.25%	740	1,829	280	720	II	8 December
071246011	Cagting	2.1%	1,712	1,597	▴	0.48%	1,044	2,580	160	420	VII	24 January
071246027	Calanggaman	2.1%	1,689	1,623	▴	0.28%	618	1,527	270	710	III	8 December
071246056	California	1.1%	941	801	▴	1.12%	319	788	290	760	II	13 May
071246012	Camali‑an	0.8%	642	581	▴	0.70%	532	1,315	120	310	III	26 November
071246013	Camambugan	3.2%	2,591	2,251	▴	0.98%	547	1,352	470	1,200	IV	15 May
071246015	Casate	3.2%	2,661	2,512	▴	0.40%	460	1,137	580	1,500	IV	5 April
071246017	Cuya	0.7%	538	516	▴	0.29%	66	163	820	2,100	VIII	6 February
071246018	Fatima	4.1%	3,340	3,235	▴	0.22%	66	163	5,100	13,000	V	13 May
071246019	Gabi	1.7%	1,432	1,378	▴	0.27%	1,646	4,067	87	230	II	9 December
071246020	Governor Boyles	1.1%	885	888	▾	−0.02%	824	2,036	110	280	I	15 May
071246021	Guintabo‑an	0.8%	676	686	▾	−0.10%	66	163	1,000	2,700	VIII	15 January
071246022	Hambabauran	1.5%	1,205	1,106	▴	0.60%	521	1,287	230	600	III	15 January
071246023	Humayhumay	2.2%	1,802	1,708	▴	0.37%	815	2,014	220	570	IV	14 February
071246024	Ilihan	0.9%	768	802	▾	−0.30%	683	1,688	110	290	I	15 May
071246025	Imelda	2.3%	1,865	1,761	▴	0.40%	657	1,624	280	740	VII	8 May & 27 November
071246026	Juagdan	1.4%	1,185	1,121	▴	0.39%	121	299	980	2,500	VII	23 May
071246016	Katarungan	2.0%	1,680	1,524	▴	0.68%	409	1,011	410	1,100	V	30 May
071246031	Lomangog	3.2%	2,650	2,025	▴	1.89%	642	1,586	410	1,100	II	15 January
071246030	Los Angeles	0.7%	601	436	▴	2.25%	274	677	220	570	II	27 April
071246032	Pag‑asa	1.5%	1,273	1,168	▴	0.60%	378	934	340	870	III	8 December
071246033	Pangpang	1.6%	1,328	1,220	▴	0.59%	450	1,112	300	760	IV	15 December
071246034	Poblacion	4.1%	3,331	3,633	▾	−0.60%	199	492	1,700	4,300	V	Last Friday of January 31 Jan 2025; 30 Jan 2026; 29 Jan 2027
071246037	San Francisco	2.1%	1,688	1,677	▴	0.05%	1,107	2,736	150	390	I	26 June
071246038	San Isidro	0.9%	771	707	▴	0.60%	262	647	290	760	VI	21 May
071246040	San Pascual	4.6%	3,783	3,127	▴	1.33%	973	2,404	390	1,000	I	Last Saturday of April 26 Apr 2025; 25 Apr 2026; 24 Apr 2027
071246041	San Vicente	1.3%	1,056	1,074	▾	−0.12%	966	2,387	110	280	VIII	5 April
071246043	Sentinela	1.1%	939	969	▾	−0.22%	271	670	350	900	VI	29 May
071246044	Sinandigan	2.7%	2,242	1,874	▴	1.25%	607	1,500	370	960	VII	8 December
071246045	Tapal	1.8%	1,516	1,371	▴	0.70%	290	717	520	1,400	VI	3 May
071246046	Tapon	3.4%	2,828	2,481	▴	0.91%	153	378	1,800	4,800	V	29 June
071246047	Tintinan	0.9%	707	623	▴	0.88%	31	77	2,300	5,900	VIII	29 September
071246048	Tipolo	3.1%	2,526	2,456	▴	0.20%	655	1,619	390	1,000	VI	5 April
071246049	Tubog	1.2%	983	885	▴	0.73%	514	1,270	190	500	III	16 May
071246050	Tuboran	1.7%	1,394	1,372	▴	0.11%	547	1,352	250	660	IV	15 January
071246052	Union	2.9%	2,392	2,332	▴	0.18%	514	1,270	470	1,200	VI	15 January
071246054	Villa Teresita	1.8%	1,482	1,407	▴	0.36%	262	647	570	1,500	I	28 November
	Total		82,179	68,578	▴	1.26%	33,506	82,795	250	14		

== Demographics ==
Population census of Ubay

Year	Pop.	±% p.a.
1903	7,355	—
1918	8,255	+0.77%
1939	21,213	+4.60%
1948	29,961	+3.91%
1960	34,090	+1.08%
1970	32,717	−0.41%

Year	Pop.	±% p.a.
1975	34,195	+0.89%
1980	38,289	+2.29%
1990	48,902	+2.48%
1995	50,745	+0.70%
2000	59,827	+3.59%
2007	65,900	+1.34%

Year	Pop.	±% p.a.
2010	68,578	+1.46%
2015	73,712	+1.38%
2020	81,799	+2.22%
2024	82,179	+0.11%

Source: Philippine Statistics Authority

When the first national census was held in 1903, the municipality had a population 7,355. It continued to grow until 1960 with 34,090 (annual growth rate of 2.73% over the period). The population markedly decreased in 1970 with the creation of the municipality of President Carlos P. Garcia, formerly a constituent barangay. Since 1970, average annual growth rate (1970–2020) is 1.85%.

The primary language is Cebuano: Filipino and English are understood to a limited degree.

== Economy ==
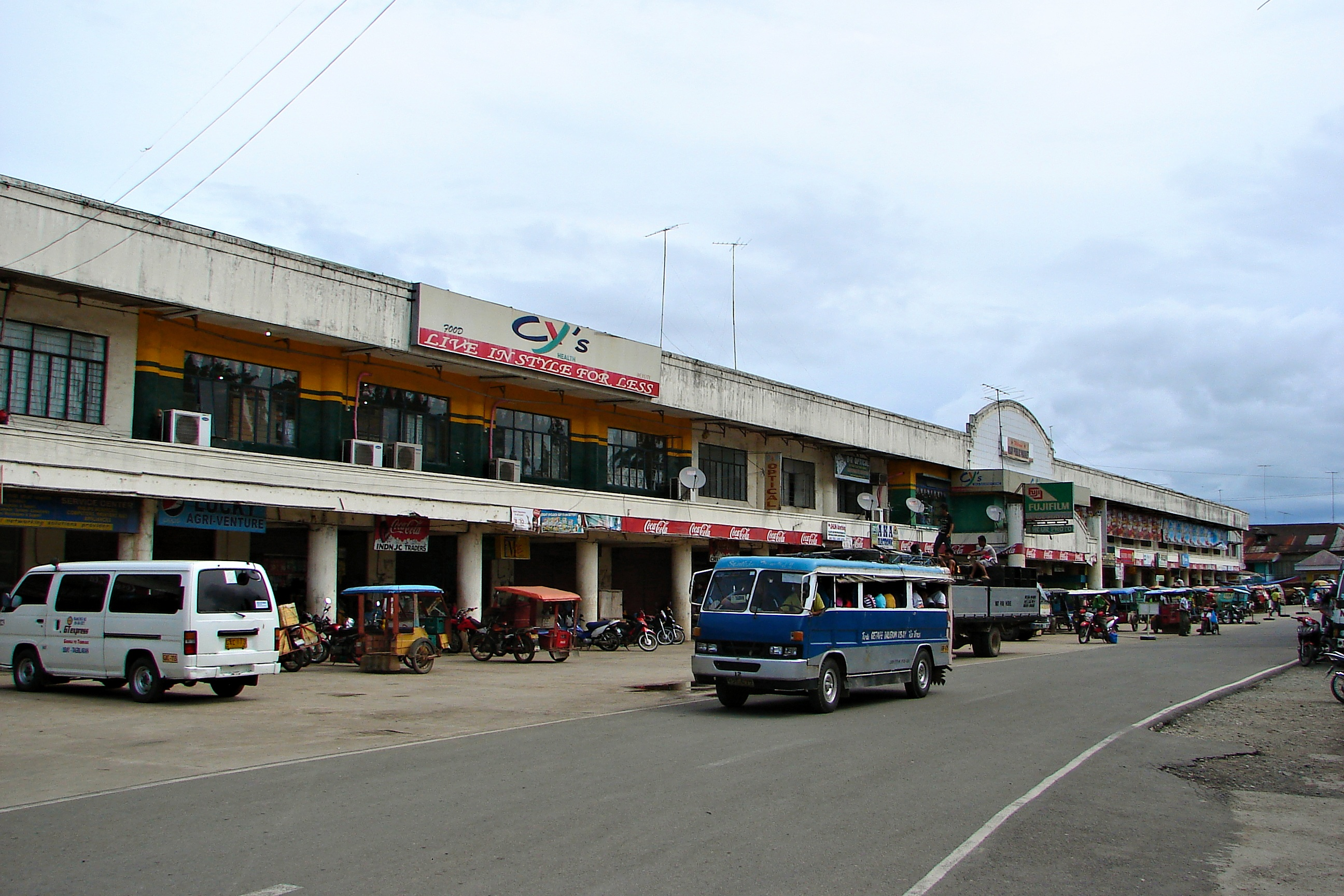
Public market

Poverty incidence of Ubay (%)

Source: Philippine Statistics Authority

Ubay has a number of business establishments commercial trading firms engaged in retail and wholesale. The new public market building was completed in 2000. The regular market day is Monday and local traders from neighboring towns come to sell their merchandise consisting mostly of agricultural products and small consumer items like used clothes, household utensils, and other products. Ubay also provides a market for the neighboring island municipality of Pres. Carlos P. Garcia, Municipality of Bien Unido, Alica and Mabini. Another well-known public market is located in barangay San Pascual, south of the municipality.

Ubay is one of the growth centers in and considered the dairy capital of the province where the Philippine Carabao Center (PCC), National Dairy Authority (NDA) and the Ubay Stock Farm the largest and oldest livestock in the country with more than 3,000 hectares is located in the Municipality. The Municipality is also center for agri-industrial production and the biggest producers of poultry products in central visayas produced by the Marcela Farms Inc. (Alturas group of companies) located in Barangay Lomangog produce tons of poultry products like dress chicken. Ubay is also one of the top producers of fish products as it has more than 1,000 hectares of fishpond. The Municipality is a center for agriculture with government establishments like the Philippine Coconut Authority (PCA), the Bureau of Fisheries and Aquatic Resources (BFAR), Bohol Experiential Station (BES), Bureau of Soil and Water Management (BSWM) and the Central Visayas Integrated Agricultural Research Center (CENVIARC) are located. The Municipality is also considered the rice granary of the province with 51% of its total land area is intended for agriculture in which majority of its rice fields are irrigated.

== Tourism and culture ==
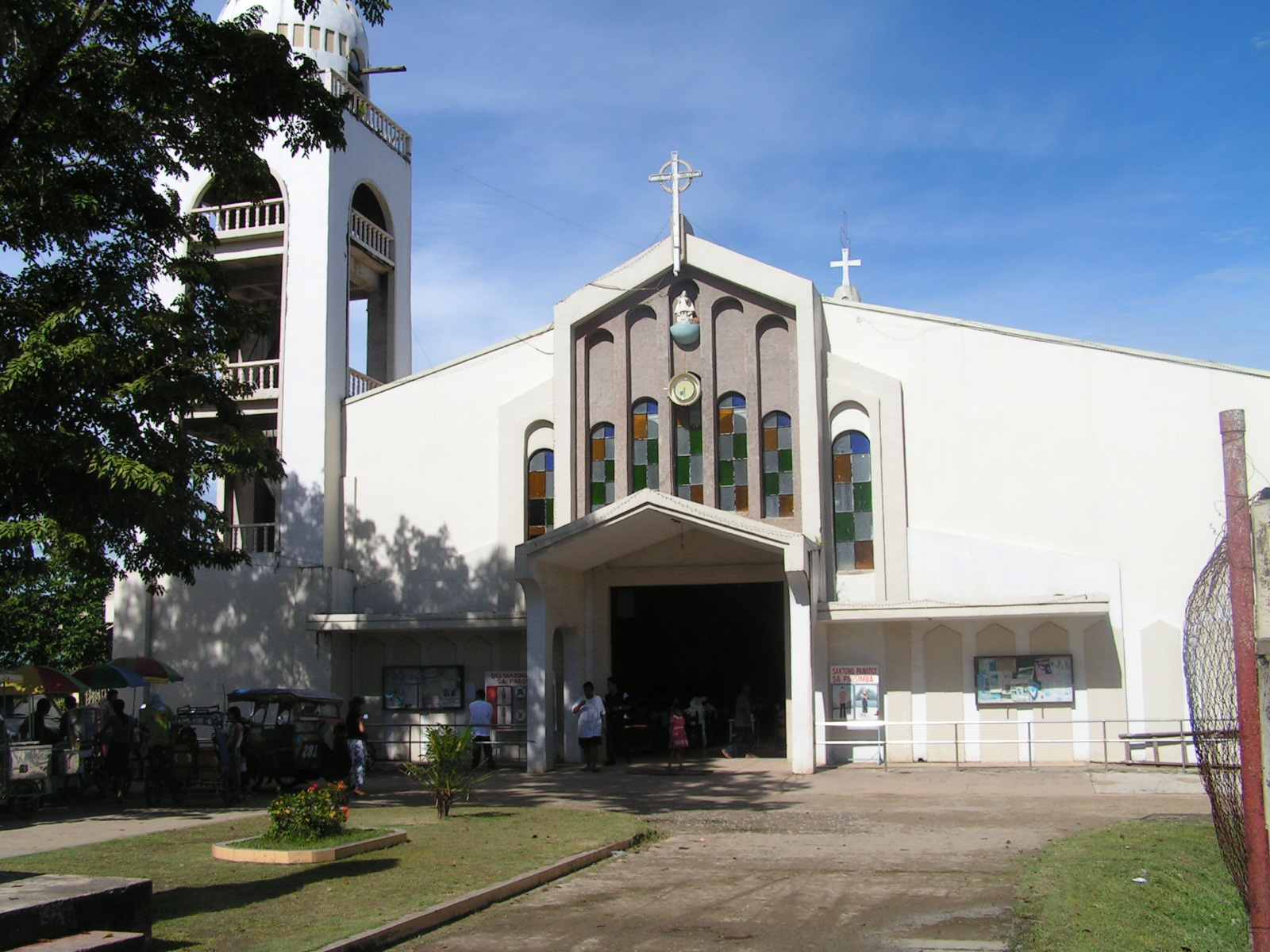
Santo Niño Parish Church, Población

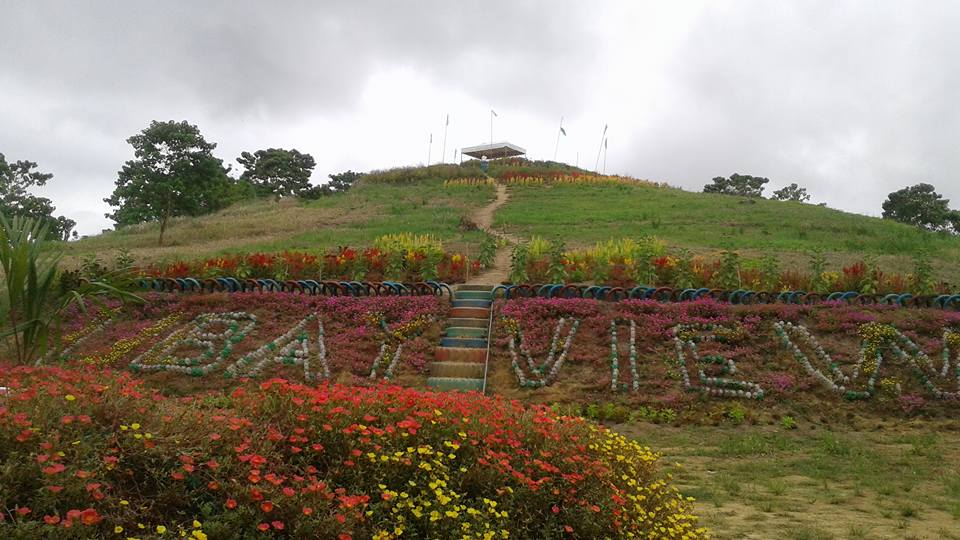
Ubay Green Park, Imelda

Ubay is the center of Eco-Agri Tourism considering its grass land area of the Ubay Stock Farm with carabaos and cows that similar to the scenery of New Zealand plus the learning experience you will gain when you visit their Department of Agriculture Facilities.

=== Delicacies ===
- Ube Calamay: It is a purple rice cake, (Calamay) with Ube or purple yam. This sweet and delightful delicacy is said to be originated from this town because of its large plantations of Ube (purple yam).
- Fried Ube bread: Another mouthwatering delicacy made of ube. It is bread deep‑fried then filled with purple yam.
- Chocobao: a chocolate flavored pasteurized carabao milk that has a nutritional value that is a product of the Philippine Carabao Center in Barangay Lomangog.
- Puto cheese: a special puto made from the milk of carabao.
- Other dairy Products

=== Ubay-ubay Festival ===
Like the Sinulog of Cebu, the Ubay-ubay Festival is the town's own version in celebration and honor of the patron saint, Sr. Santo Niño. This event is where people flock the town's major roads and venues to view the grand street parade and the festival dance-competition. This celebration is held every last Friday of January.

== Government ==
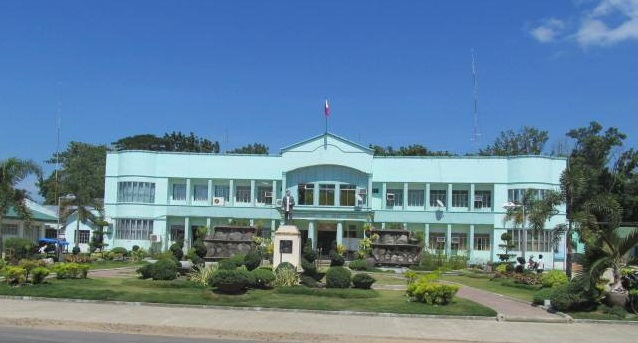
Ubay Municipal Hall

Ubay is governed by the municipal mayor as head of the municipality. The vice mayor is the next highest position and acts as the presiding officer of the municipal council.

Chief Executives of Ubay
Term	Title	Name
1821 – ??	Gobernadorcillo	Toribio Reyes
1854 – 1855	Gobernadorcillo	Ysidro Cutamora
1855 – 1856	Gobernadorcillo	Calistro Boiser
1856 – 1857	Gobernadorcillo	Vicente Boiser
1857 – ??	Gobernadorcillo	Santiago Cutamora
1876 – ??	Gobernadorcillo	Saturnino Boyles
1892 – 1894	Gobernadorcillo	Marcelino Mendez
1894 – 1896	Capitan Municipal	Marcelino Mendez
1896 – 1901	Capitan Municipal	Juan Gaviola
1901 – 1902	Presidente Municipal	Ruperto Gaviola
1902 – 1906	Presidente Municipal	Eutiquio Boyles
1906 – 1910	Presidente Municipal	Ruperto Gaviola
1910 – 1912	Presidente Municipal	Bonifacio Reyes
1912 – 1924	Presidente Municipal	Ruperto Gaviola
1925 – 1930	Presidente Municipal	Jose Garces
1931 – 1935	Presidente Municipal	Carlos Boiser
1936 – 1940	Presidente Municipal	Ruperto Gaviola
1941 – 1942	Presidente Municipal	Lucio Cutanda
1942 – 1943	Military Mayor	Samson Sabalones
1944 – 1945	Military Mayor	Frank Lombardo
1946 – 1948	Municipal Mayor	Lucio Cutanda
1949 –	OIC Municipal Mayor	Marcelo Cuyno
1949 – 1952	Municipal Mayor	Lucio Cutanda
1953 – 1964	Municipal Mayor	Ricardo Boyles
1965 – 1968	Municipal Mayor	Sabiniano Cuyno
1969 – 1978	Municipal Mayor	Rufina Delima
1979 – 1980	OIC Municipal Mayor	Eutiquio Bernales
1981 – 1984	Municipal Mayor	Eutiquio Bernales
1985 – 1986	OIC Municipal Mayor	Pedro Sarabosing
1986 – 1987	OIC Municipal Mayor	Agapito Valleser
1987 – 1992	Municipal Mayor	Eliseo Boyles
1992 – 1998	Municipal Mayor	Eutiquio Bernales
1998 – 2004	Municipal Mayor	Manuel Alesna
2004 – 2013	Municipal Mayor	Eutiquio Bernales
2013 – 2016	Municipal Mayor	Galicano Atup
2016 – 2025	Municipal Mayor	Constantino Reyes
2025 – present	Municipal Mayor	Violeta Diangco-Reyes

== Infrastructure ==
=== Transport ===
The most common form of local transportation is the tricycle for nearer barangays. For far barangays, the motorcycle is the most common. All barangays are connected by roads and the only places without roads are the steep slopes of the central mountains.

The improvement of the Bohol circumferential road and the port facilities helped Ubay to become the trading and transportation hub of northeastern Bohol, connecting it to the neighboring island of Leyte and the rest of Bohol province. Passenger and cargo traffic to these destinations has noticeably increased over the years indicating an increasing volume of trade between these points.

Land transportation is provided by various short and long-distance buses, jeeps and vans, connecting Ubay to the rest of the towns in the province. Tagbilaran can be reached from Ubay in two to three hours by bus or van. There are also daily combined road/ferry services to Metro Manila (Pasay / Cubao, Quezon City).

Ubay seaport is considered the province's principal gateway to Leyte, and Samar. Its improved port area is linked to the major port destinations of neighboring provinces such as Bato and Hilongos in Leyte, Maasin City in Southern Leyte, and Cebu City, the regional capital. Four vessels travels to and from Cebu City daily, and routes to and from Bato, Hilongos and Maasin City are also served daily. The journey time for each destination is 4–5 hours.

Tapal Wharf is another port terminal located in northeastern barangay of Tapal that serves the route between President Carlos P. Garcia and Ubay.

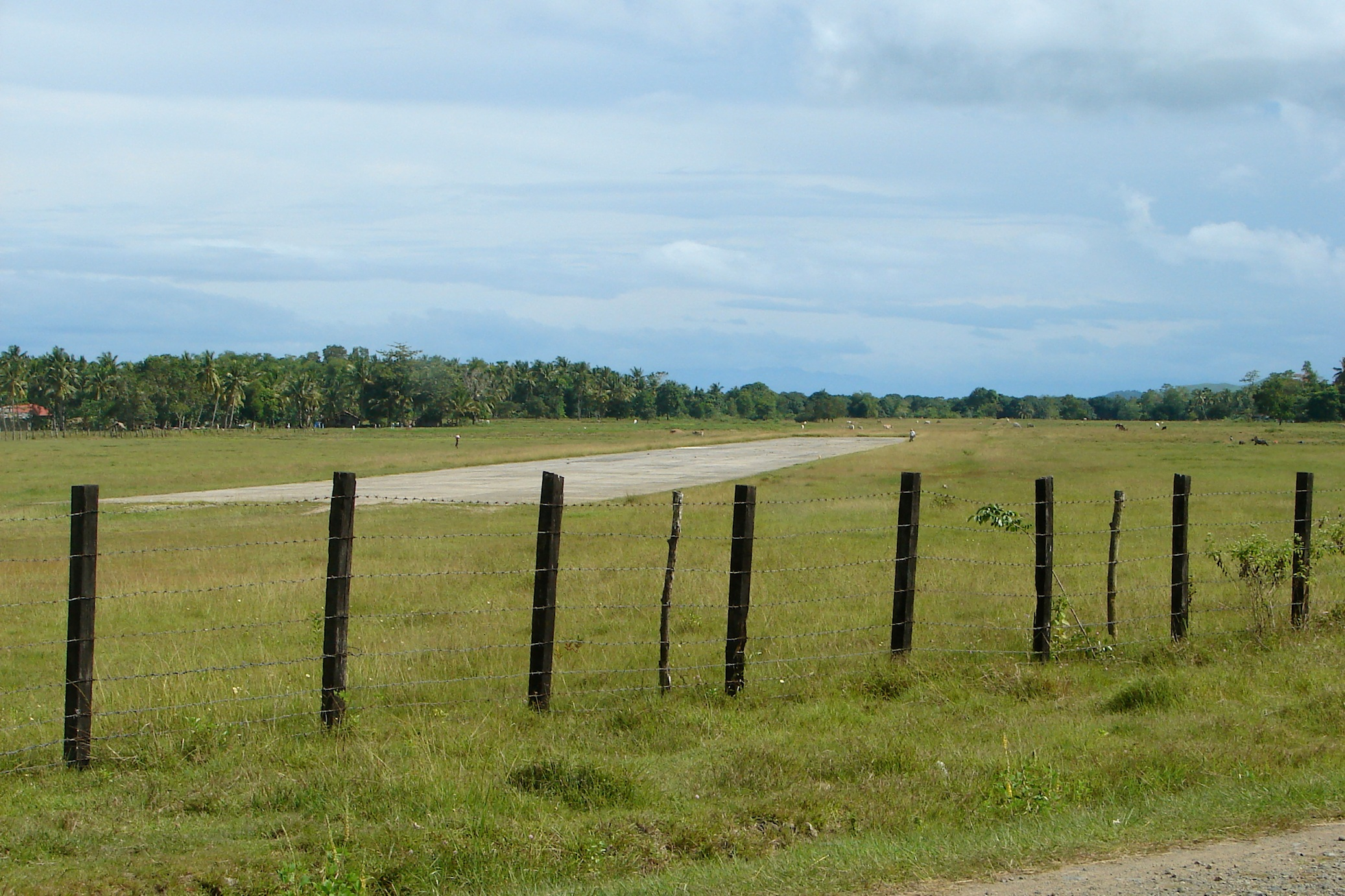
Ubay Airport

Camambugan Airport

Ubay is home to one of only three airports in Bohol (the other Bohol–Panglao International Airport and Tagbilaran Old Airport), but Ubay Airport is currently ongoing expansion and development which is delayed by the recent pandemic. The runway currently is only about 1,000 metres (3,280 ft) long. It is proposed to be a service airport for airlines and budget airport that will connect to other provinces and tourists from other tourism destinations.

=== Health ===
For health services, the town has three public Rural Health Units (RHU) staffed by doctors, nurses, midwives, dentists, medical technologists and sanitary inspectors. A small government hospital was established to provide outpatient services to local residents. A private 15-bed hospital in Fatima also provides services for emergencies. A pediatrics and OB-gyne clinic complements the health services available in town. A Public Rural Health Unit (RHU) 4 and RHU 5 is being eyed to be constructed within three years period in 2023–2025.

Don Emilio Del Valle Memorial Hospital in barangay Bood is a National Government Hospital was established in 2003 from a donated lot with a current bed capacity of 300 as of 2019. It became the first agency in the province to be granted with ISO 9001:2008 QMS Certification by TUV SUD. In July 2015, it was granted a certificate of full ISO compliance by TUV SUD. In 2017, it acquired its ISO 9001:2015 Certification by TÜV Rheinland.

Barangay Health Workers (BHW) from each barangay provide direct health care assistance to barangay residents.

=== Public order and safety ===
The local police force is 37 police officers. Police–population ratio is 1:2,211, less favourable than the standard ratio of 1:1,000. The police are augmented by 492 Barangay Tanod volunteers. It is reported that crime rate in Ubay is relatively low. The local Fire Department is staffed by eight fire fighters with two fire trucks. Incidence of fires is reportedly low in the municipality.

=== Utilities ===
Bohol was linked to the major source of geothermal power in Leyte through the underwater connection between Maasin City, Southern Leyte and Ubay. Presently, only three of the 44 barangays have no electricity, yet only 34.97 percent of the total households in the municipality have electricity compared to the province, which was 58.3 percent energized in 2000.

The town proper and seven other barangays were served by the Ubay Water Service Cooperative. The cooperative planned to expand their service to eight other barangays in the near future. Due to consumer demand and the limited size of the supply, water service became difficult during dry months. Bohol province reported that 23.71 percent of its households had their own faucets from a community system while Ubay reported only 8.97 percent.

For the province, 21.68 percent of households had access to shared faucets while Ubay only had 8.86 percent. In Ubay, slightly more than half (51.83%) of the households had access to dug wells.

== Education ==
=== Elementary Education ===
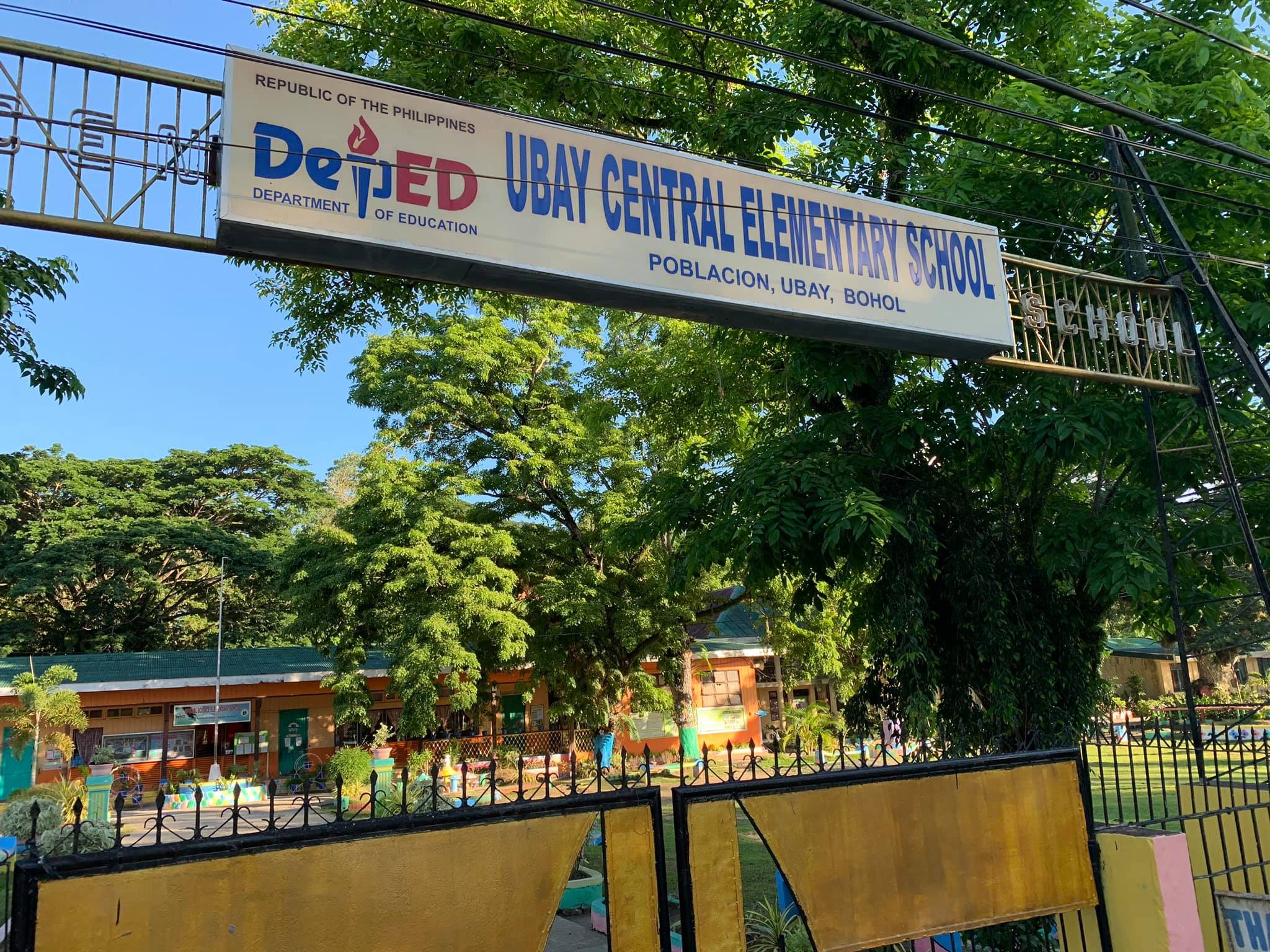
Ubay Central Elementary School at Poblacion, Ubay, Bohol, Philippines

There are 45 public elementary schools in the municipality located in each barangay and one on Tres Reyes island.

Public Elementary Schools
  - Achila Elementary School
  - Bay-ang Elementary School
  - Benliw Elementary School
  - Bongbong Elementary School
  - Bood Elementary School
  - Buenavista Elementary School
  - Bulilis Elementary School
  - Cagting Elementary School
  - Calanggaman Elementary School
  - California Elementary School
  - Camambugan Elementary School
  - Casate Elementary School
  - Cuya Elementary School
  - Fatima Elementary School
  - Gabi Elementary School
  - Gov. Boyles Elementary School
  - Guintaboan Elementary School
  - Hambabauran Elementary School
  - Humayhumay Elementary School
  - Ilihan Elementary School
  - Imelda Elementary School
  - Juagdan Elementary School
  - Katarungan Elementary School
  - Lomangog Elementary School
  - Luz Elementary School (Camalian)
  - New Los Angeles Elementary School
  - Pag-asa Elementary School
  - Pangpang Elementary School
  - San Francisco Elementary School
  - San Isidro Elementary School
  - San Vicente Elementary School
  - Sentinela Elementary School
  - Sinandigan Elementary School
  - Tapal Integrated School
  - Tapon Elementary School
  - Tintinan Elementary School
  - Tipolo Elementary School
  - Tres Reyes Elementary School
  - Tubog Integrated School
  - Tuboran Elementary School
  - Ubay Central Elementary School (Poblacion)
  - Ubay II Central Elementary School (Biabas)
  - Ubay III Central Elementary School (San Pascual)
  - Union Elementary School
  - Villa Teresita Elementary School

There are 7 private pre-school and elementary schools.

Private Pre-school and Elementary Schools
  - Benliw Apostolic Christian School, Inc. (Pre-school and Elementary Education)
  - Bohol Northern Star Colleges (Pre-school and Elementary Education) at Poblacion
  - Grace Multi-Level School (Pre-school) at Fatima
  - ICTHUS Christian Academy (Pre-school and Elementary Education) at Poblacion
  - Montessori Educational Learning Center of Ubay (Pre-school and Elementary Education) at Tapon
  - Sacred Heart Learning & Formation Center (Pre-school and Elementary Education) at Poblacion
  - Ubay Baptist Christian Academy (Pre-school and Elementary Education) at Fatima
  - Ubay Seventh-day Adventist Multigrade School (Pre-school and Elementary Education) at Fatima

=== Secondary Education ===
There are 19 public and private high schools in the municipality which offer junior and senior high school curriculum.

List of High Schools
School ID	Institution Name	Location	Junior HS	Senior HS	Academic Track(s)	Type
302816	Biabas Trade High School	Biabas	Yes	Yes	GAS^{2}, TVL^{5}	Public
404289	Bohol Northern Star Colleges	Poblacion	Yes	Yes	ABM^{1}, HUMSS^{3}, GAS, TVL	Private
312334	Bulilis National High School	Bulilis	Yes	Yes	ABM, GAS, HUMSS, STEM	Public
312351	Cagting High School	Cagting	Yes	Yes	GAS, TVL	Public
302825	Camambugan National High School	Camambugan	Yes	Yes	GAS, TVL	Public
312361	Don Aguedo Reyes Maboloc Memorial National HS	Villa Teresita	Yes	No		Public
313031	Erico Aumentado High School	Poblacion	Yes	No		Public
312354	Hambabauran High School	Hambabauran	Yes	No		Public
404291	Holy Child Academy	Poblacion	Yes	Yes	ABM, GAS	Private
446513	ICTHUS Christian Academy	Poblacion	Yes	Yes	GAS, STEM^{4}	Private
405892	Montessori Educational Learning Center	Tapon	Yes	Yes	GAS, TVL	Private
500215	Pedro O. Bernales National High School	Tubog	Yes	Yes	TVL	Public
305935	Ricardo O. Boyles Sr. National High School	Casate	Yes			Public
404293	San Pascual Academy	San Pascual	Yes	Yes	GAS	Private
302899	San Pascual National Agricultural High School	San Pascual	Yes	Yes	TVL	Public
312346	Tapal Integrated School	Tapal	Yes	Yes	TVL	Public
306874	Tipolo National High School	Tipolo	Yes			Public
302915	Ubay National Science High School	Fatima	Yes	Yes	ABM, HUMSS, STEM, TVL	Public
302914	Union National High School	Union	Yes	Yes	GAS, TVL	Public

^1 Accountancy, Business, and Management (ABM)
^2 General Academic Strand (GAS)
^3 Humanities and Social Sciences (HUMSS)
^4 Science, Technology, Engineering, and Mathematics (STEM)
^5 Technical, Vocational, and Livelihood (TVL)

=== Tertiary Education ===
- Bohol Northern Star Colleges - To meet the increasing demands for college education, Bohol Northeastern College was founded in 1996 by Bohol political leaders, former governors Erico B. Aumentado and David B. Tirol. The name was later changed to its present name in January 2007.
- Ubay Community College

== Notable personalities ==
- Erico B. Aumentado – Bohol governor who served three consecutive terms (2001–2010), former deputy speaker of the Philippine House of Representatives, former congressman of Bohol's 2nd District, former provincial vice-governor and board member.
- Karen Gallman - beauty queen, Miss Intercontinental 2018, the first ever Filipina to win the title. Also won Binibining Pilipinas Intercontinental 2018.
- Alberto Uy - Archbishop of Cebu

== Sources ==
- Akpenodu, Erik; Saloma, Czarina (2011). Casa Boholana: Vintage Houses of Bohol. Ateneo de Manila University Press. ISBN 978-9715506182.
- Bohol Chronicle, Antonio Amora. "A Legacy of Life and Work". Archived from the original on 16 January 2014.
- Bohol Standard (4 July 2010). "Ubay port offers a better life for many Boholanos". Archived from the original on 9 April 2015.
- Coronas, José (1920). The Climate and Weather of the Philippines, 1903 – 1918. Manila Observatory: Bureau of Philippines.
- Espinola, Manny; Maghirang, Antonio (2014). Ave, Jon P.; Rodriguez, Ces (eds.). NIA at 50 : A Legacy of Serving Filipino Farmers (PDF). Photography Raneil Ibay; Graphic Artists: Mario Santa Maria, Shannon Olaguer; Research Assistants: Jun Danganan, CJ Brillantes. National Irrigation Administration and Project Brio Media House. pp. 62–63. ISBN 978-9719596202. Archived from the original (PDF) on 2016-03-04.
- Kaufmann, J. (1934). Visayan-English Dictionary (PDF). Iloilo.
- Saz, Efren B. (2007). A comprehensive assessment of the agricultural extension system in the Philippines: case study of LGU extension in Ubay, Bohol (PDF). Philippine Institute for Development Studies, University of Leyte. Archived from the original (PDF) on 4 March 2016.
