= Pilar, Bohol =

Municipality in Bohol, Philippines

Pilar
- Municipality
- Municipality of Pilar
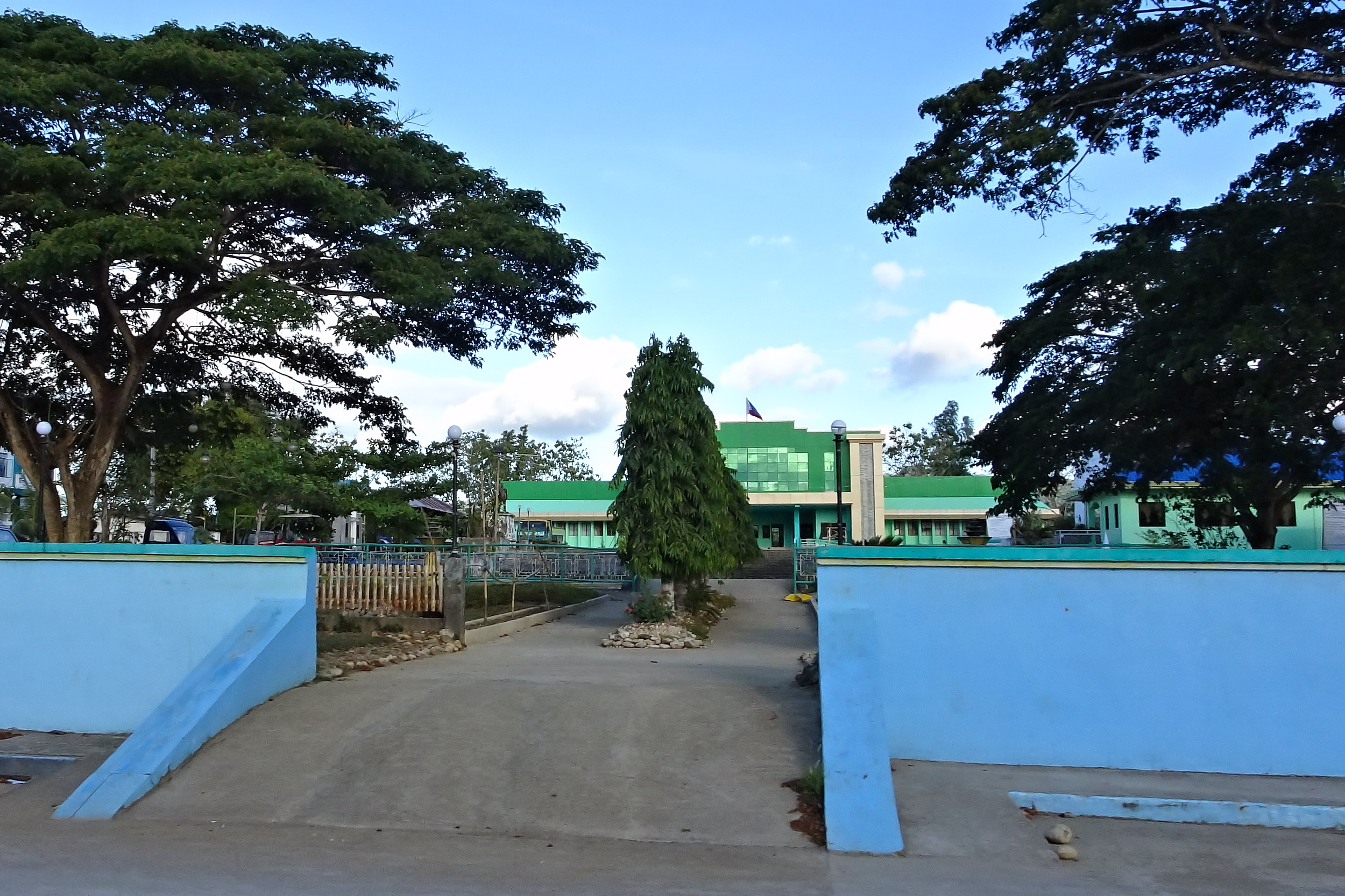
- Municipal hall

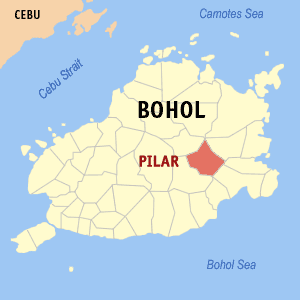
- Map of Bohol with Pilar highlighted
- Interactive map of Pilar
- Location within the Philippines
- Coordinates: 9°50′N 124°20′E
- Country: Philippines
- Region: Central Visayas
- Province: Bohol
- District: 3rd district
- Founded: 26 December 1960
- Barangays: 21 (see Barangays)

Government
  - Type: Sangguniang Bayan
  - Mayor: Wilson L. Pajo
  - Vice Mayor: Eugenio B. Datahan II
  - Representative: Kristine Alexie B. Tutor
  - Municipal Council: Members: Carlos D. Cagape; Jaime A. Lusica; Samia D. Hilot; Wilfredo L. Bernante; Jaime A. Ucab; Columba A. Buslon; Francisco A. Auguis; Edgar A. Doydoy
  - Electorate: 20,028 voters (2025)

Area
  - Total: 120.39 km^{2} (46.48 sq mi)
- Elevation: 205 m (673 ft)
- Highest elevation: 634 m (2,080 ft)
- Lowest elevation: 118 m (387 ft)

Population (2024 census)
  - Total: 28,860
  - Density: 239.7/km^{2} (620.9/sq mi)
  - Households: 6,608

Economy
  - Income class: 3rd municipal income class
  - Poverty incidence: 23.5% (2023)
  - Revenue: ₱ 162.9 million (2024)
  - Assets: ₱ 530 million (2024)
  - Expenditure: ₱ 95.89 million (2024)
  - Liabilities: ₱ 252.6 million (2024)

Service provider
  - Electricity: Bohol 2 Electric Cooperative (BOHECO 2)
- Time zone: UTC+8 (PST)
- ZIP code: 6321
- PSGC: 071234000
- IDD : area code: +63 (0)38
- Native languages: Boholano dialect Cebuano; Eskayan; Tagalog

Pilar, officially the Municipality of Pilar (Cebuano: Munisipyo sa Pilar; Tagalog: Bayan ng Pilar), is a municipality in the province of Bohol, Philippines. According to the 2024 census, it has a population of 28,860 people.

Pilar is 77 kilometres (48 mi) from Tagbilaran.

Pilar celebrates its fiesta on October 12, to honor the town patron Virgen del Pilar.

== History ==
Pilar was formerly a barrio known as Banlasan (later renamed Alegria), which is used to be the town center of the municipality of Sierra Bullones. Constant flooding from Wahig River led residents of Sierra Bullones to transfer their town center at barangay Candagaz and named it as Poblacion. Alegria was then called Lungsod Daan which means old town.

On December 29, 1961, Lungsod Daan became an independepent municipality and it was renamed Pilar after the patron saint, Virgen del Pilar. A total of 16 barangays from the municipalities of Candijay, Guindulman, Sierra Bullones, and Ubay are carved out from their territories to form the new municipality through the Executive Order No. 460 issued by President Carlos P. Garcia, becoming the 45th town in the province Below is list of 16 original barrios of Pilar:

Original Barangays of Pilar, Bohol
From Sierra Bullones			From Candijay	From Guindulman	From Ubay
Aurora	Cagawasan	Pamacsalan	Inaghuban (with sitio Cansungay)	Lundag (with sitio San Vicente)	San Isidro (with sitio La Suerte)
Bagacay	Catagdaan	Pamacsalan	Inaghuban (with sitio Cansungay)	Lundag (with sitio San Vicente)	San Isidro (with sitio La Suerte)
Bagumbayan	Estaca	Rizal (with sitio Del Pilar)	Inaghuban (with sitio Cansungay)	Lundag (with sitio San Vicente)	San Isidro (with sitio La Suerte)
Bayong	Ilaud	Rizal (with sitio Del Pilar)	Inaghuban (with sitio Cansungay)	Lundag (with sitio San Vicente)	San Isidro (with sitio La Suerte)
Buena Suerte	Lungsod Daan (Poblacion) (with sitio Lumbay)	San Carlos	Inaghuban (with sitio Cansungay)	Lundag (with sitio San Vicente)	San Isidro (with sitio La Suerte)

Consequently, president Carlos P. Garcia named Demetria B. Buslon and Marcos Auguis as first mayor and vice-mayor of the town respectively. Also appointed were first councilors Sinoforoso Cabañez, Dionisio Cagas, Anastacio Jasper, and Celestino Ente.

== Geography ==
=== Barangays ===
Pilar is politically subdivided into 21 barangays. Each barangay consists of puroks and some have sitios.

PSGC	Barangay	Population			±% p.a.	
		2024		2010		
071234001	Aurora	1.5%	431	410	▴	0.35%
071234002	Bagacay	3.0%	862	890	▾	−0.22%
071234003	Bagumbayan	6.6%	1,908	1,725	▴	0.70%
071234004	Bayong	5.0%	1,432	1,493	▾	−0.29%
071234005	Buenasuerte	6.6%	1,894	1,918	▾	−0.09%
071234006	Cagawasan	3.7%	1,079	1,086	▾	−0.04%
071234007	Cansungay	2.8%	820	769	▴	0.45%
071234008	Catagdaan	5.2%	1,492	1,546	▾	−0.25%
071234009	Del Pilar	3.1%	898	890	▴	0.06%
071234010	Estaca	10.1%	2,924	2,575	▴	0.88%
071234011	Ilaud	2.6%	764	929	▾	−1.35%
071234012	Inaghuban	3.7%	1,062	1,235	▾	−1.04%
071234013	La Suerte	2.5%	726	752	▾	−0.24%
071234014	Lumbay	4.2%	1,212	1,161	▴	0.30%
071234015	Lundag	2.7%	789	735	▴	0.49%
071234016	Pamacsalan	2.3%	656	666	▾	−0.10%
071234017	Poblacion	10.0%	2,890	2,806	▴	0.20%
071234018	Rizal	4.9%	1,425	1,282	▴	0.74%
071234019	San Carlos	2.4%	679	744	▾	−0.63%
071234020	San Isidro	8.7%	2,506	2,411	▴	0.27%
071234021	San Vicente	2.8%	807	864	▾	−0.47%
	Total		28,860	26,887	▴	0.49%

=== Climate ===
Climate data for Pilar, Bohol
Month	Jan	Feb	Mar	Apr	May	Jun	Jul	Aug	Sep	Oct	Nov	Dec	Year
Mean daily maximum °C (°F)	27 (81)	28 (82)	29 (84)	30 (86)	30 (86)	29 (84)	29 (84)	29 (84)	29 (84)	28 (82)	28 (82)	28 (82)	29 (83)
Mean daily minimum °C (°F)	22 (72)	21 (70)	22 (72)	22 (72)	23 (73)	24 (75)	23 (73)	23 (73)	23 (73)	23 (73)	22 (72)	22 (72)	23 (73)
Average precipitation mm (inches)	102 (4.0)	85 (3.3)	91 (3.6)	75 (3.0)	110 (4.3)	141 (5.6)	121 (4.8)	107 (4.2)	111 (4.4)	144 (5.7)	169 (6.7)	139 (5.5)	1,395 (55.1)
Average rainy days	18.6	14.8	16.5	16.7	23.9	26.4	25.6	24.1	24.4	26.3	23.7	20.5	261.5
Source: Meteoblue (modeled/calculated data, not measured locally)

== Demographics ==
Population census of Pilar

Year	Pop.	±% p.a.
1970	10,888	—
1975	13,928	+5.06%
1980	14,902	+1.36%
1990	19,930	+2.95%
1995	21,141	+1.11%
2000	25,095	+3.74%

Year	Pop.	±% p.a.
2007	27,276	+1.16%
2010	26,887	−0.52%
2015	27,256	+0.26%
2020	28,693	+1.09%
2024	28,860	+0.14%

Source: Philippine Statistics Authority

== Economy ==
Poverty incidence of Pilar (%)

Source: Philippine Statistics Authority

== Gallery ==
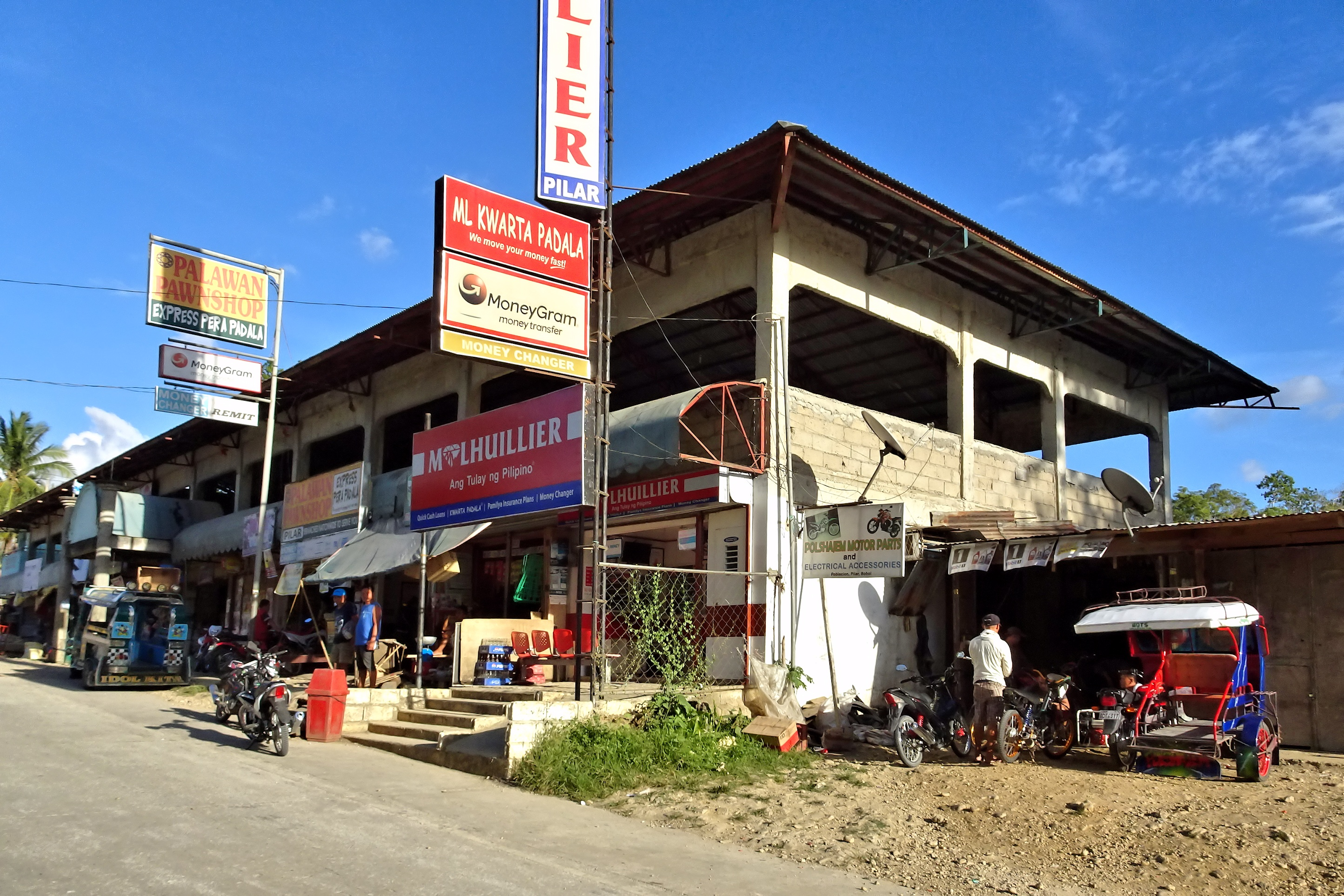
Old public market in Pilar

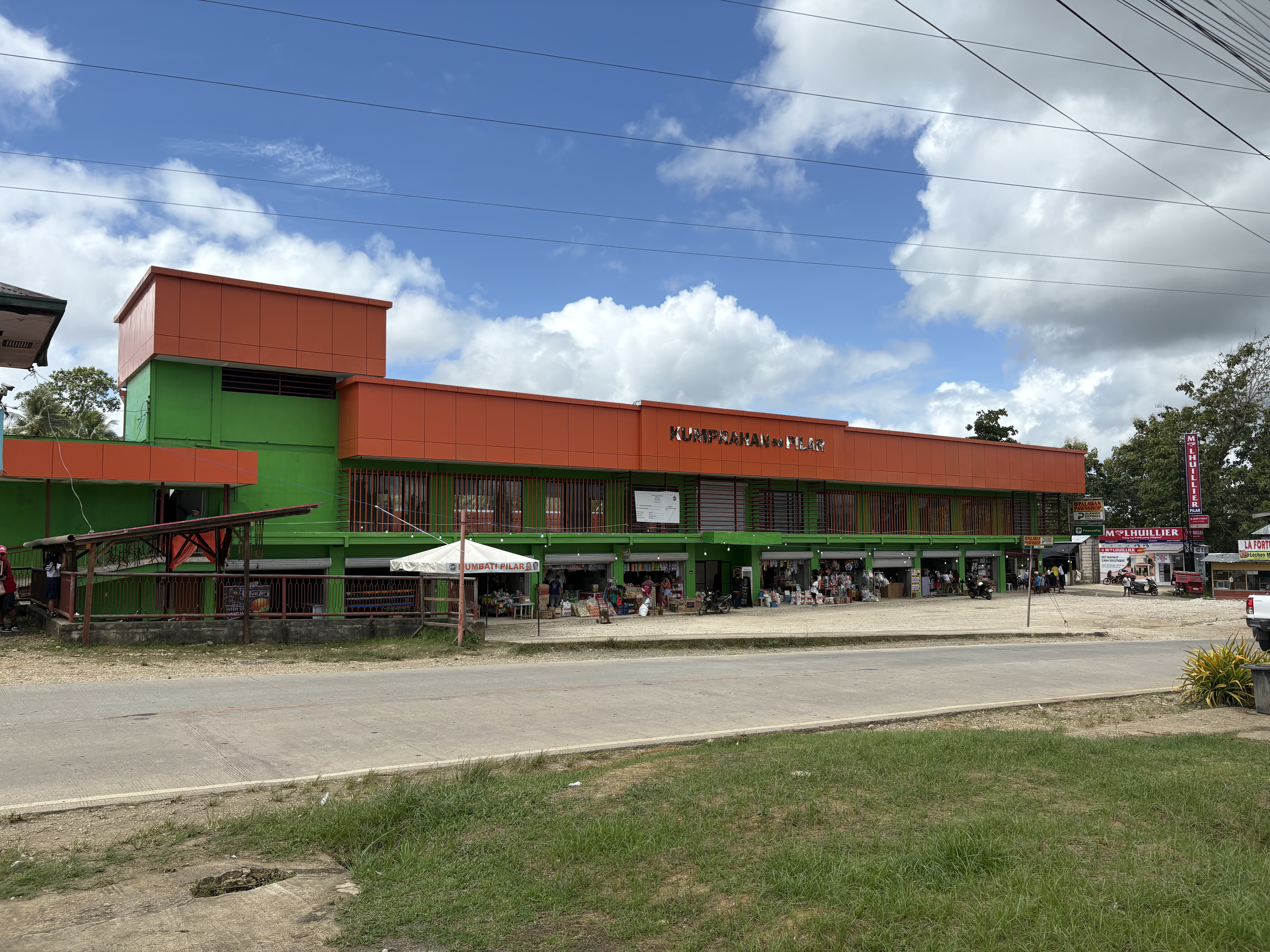
A new public market recently replaced the old one.

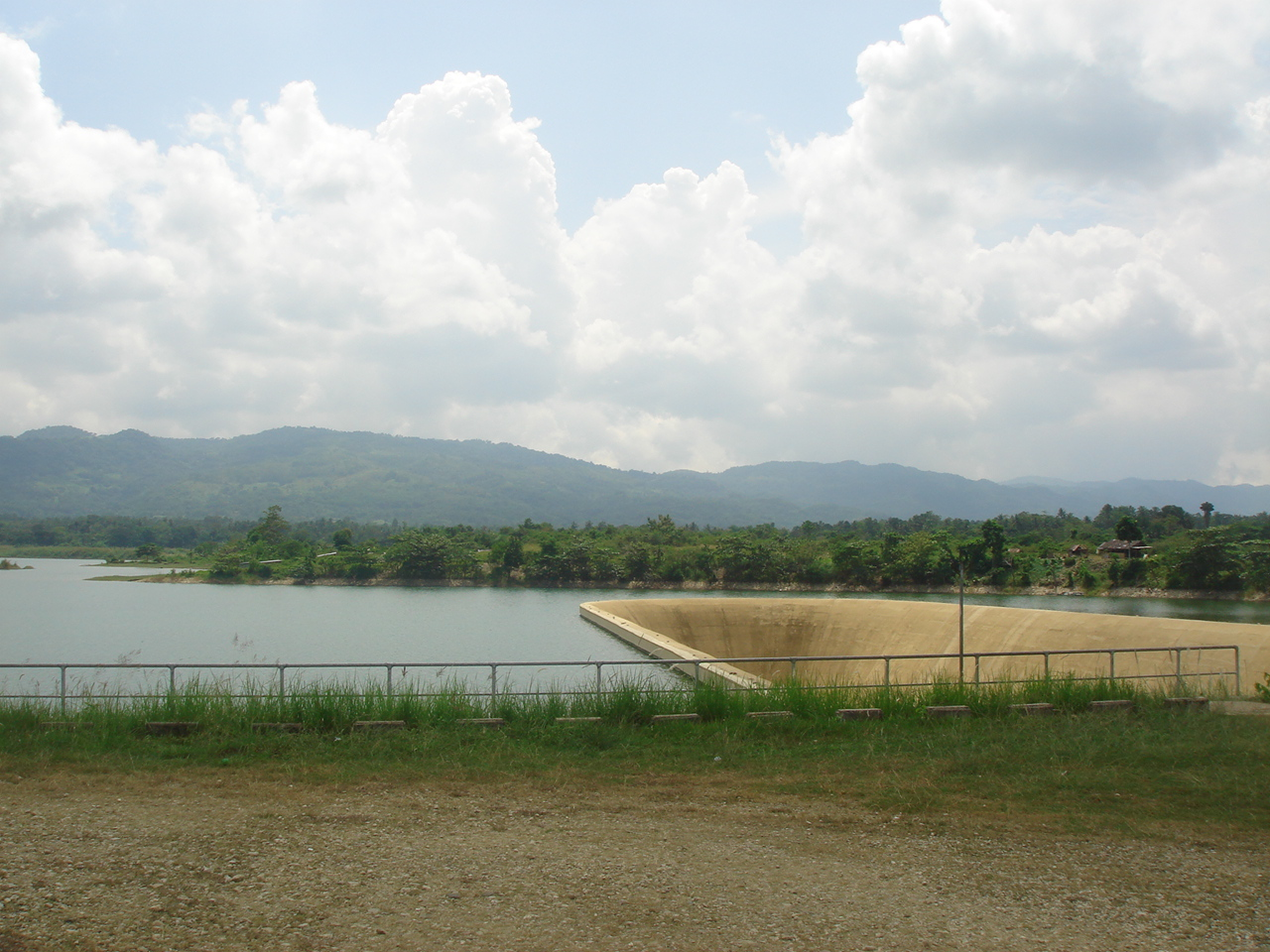
Malinao Dam spillway in Pilar
