= President Carlos P. Garcia, Bohol =

Municipality in Bohol, Philippines

President Carlos P. Garcia Pitogo
- Municipality
- Municipality of President Carlos P. Garcia
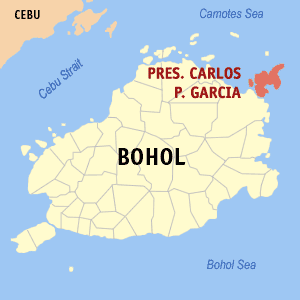
- Map of Bohol with President Carlos P. Garcia highlighted
- Interactive map of President Carlos P. Garcia
- Location within the Philippines
- Coordinates: 10°07′16″N 124°33′11″E
- Country: Philippines
- Region: Central Visayas
- Province: Bohol
- District: 2nd district
- Founded Renamed: 21 June 1969
- Named for: Carlos P. Garcia
- Barangays: 23 (see Barangays)

Government
  - Type: Sangguniang Bayan
  - Mayor: Fernando B. Estavilla
  - Vice Mayor: Nestor M. Abad
  - Representative: Erico Aristotle C. Aumentado
  - Municipal Council: Members: Anecito B. Zapanta; Wilma C. Dusal; Tesalonica A. Boyboy; Erma A. Agad; Lovely Louise G. Solon; Narciso A. Baculpo; Neri A. Obligado; Charlene I. Tacumba
  - Electorate: 17,356 voters (2025)

Area
  - Total: 54.82 km^{2} (21.17 sq mi)
- Elevation: 5.0 m (16.4 ft)
- Highest elevation: 108 m (354 ft)
- Lowest elevation: 0 m (0 ft)

Population (2024 census)
  - Total: 23,858
  - Density: 435.2/km^{2} (1,127/sq mi)
  - Households: 5,727

Economy
  - Income class: 3rd municipal income class
  - Poverty incidence: 26.46% (2023)
  - Revenue: ₱ 191.3 million (2024)
  - Assets: ₱ 415 million (2024)
  - Expenditure: ₱ 193.4 million (2024)
  - Liabilities: ₱ 117.5 million (2024)

Service provider
  - Electricity: Bohol 2 Electric Cooperative (BOHECO 2)
- Time zone: UTC+8 (PST)
- ZIP code: 6346
- PSGC: 0701235000
- IDD : area code: +63 (0)38
- Native languages: Boholano dialect Cebuano; Tagalog

President Carlos P. Garcia, officially the Municipality of President Carlos P. Garcia (Cebuano: Munisipyo ni Presidente Carlos P. Garcia; Tagalog: Bayan ni Pangulong Carlos P. Garcia) and alternatively known as Pitogo, is a municipality in the province of Bohol, Philippines. According to the 2024 census, it has a population of 23,858.

It primarily consists of Lapinig Island along with a few surrounding islets.

== History ==
In the early part of the 19th century, the place was part of the municipality of Ubay, known as Lapinig Grande and subdivided into six barrios: Pitogo, Aguining, Basiao, Bonbonon, Gaus, and Tugas.

Congressman Teodoro Galagar of the 3rd Congressional District of the province of Bohol, initiated the formation of Lapining Grande into a town. Aguining, Pitogo, and Bonbonon were the barangays bidding for township. On 21 June 1969, RA 5864 was approved creating Pitogo as the 46th town of the province of Bohol with 23 regular barangays. Eight years later on 27 October 1977, it was renamed by Presidential Decree 1228 in honour of President Carlos P. Garcia, who was born in nearby Talibon.

== Geography ==
=== Barangays ===
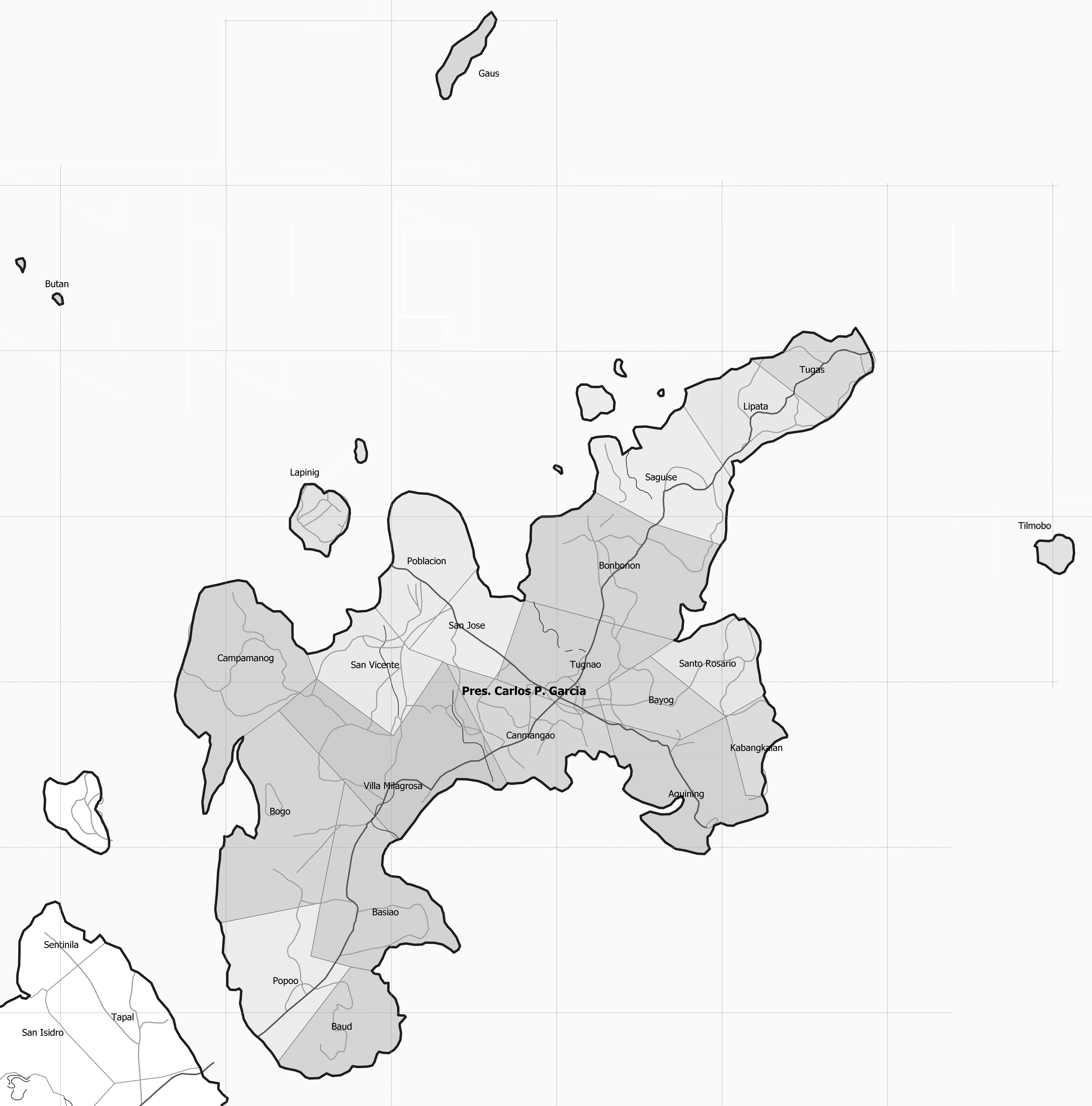
Map of President Carlos P. Garcia showing barangays and islands

President Carlos P. Garcia is politically subdivided into 23 barangays. Each barangay consists of puroks and some have sitios.

PSGC	Barangay	Population			±% p.a.	
		2024		2010		
071235001	Aguining	9.1%	2,175	2,294	▾	−0.37%
071235003	Basiao	3.8%	898	911	▾	−0.10%
071235004	Baud	2.7%	633	603	▴	0.34%
071235005	Bayog	1.3%	304	309	▾	−0.11%
071235006	Bogo	4.7%	1,128	990	▴	0.91%
071235007	Bonbonon	5.4%	1,296	1,286	▴	0.05%
071235023	Butan	2.4%	569	626	▾	−0.66%
071235009	Campamanog	6.7%	1,607	1,560	▴	0.21%
071235008	Canmangao	3.9%	939	948	▾	−0.07%
071235010	Gaus	5.0%	1,202	1,365	▾	−0.88%
071235011	Kabangkalan	1.9%	456	309	▴	2.74%
071235012	Lapinig	3.8%	896	967	▾	−0.53%
071235013	Lipata	2.5%	595	685	▾	−0.97%
071235014	Poblacion (Pitogo)	11.5%	2,745	2,700	▴	0.11%
071235015	Popoo	4.1%	985	977	▴	0.06%
071235016	Saguise	3.0%	715	745	▾	−0.28%
071235017	San Jose (Tawid)	5.0%	1,186	1,109	▴	0.47%
071235024	San Vicente	4.4%	1,047	893	▴	1.11%
071235018	Santo Rosario	1.3%	322	475	▾	−2.66%
071235019	Tilmobo	0.8%	202	197	▴	0.17%
071235020	Tugas	3.0%	723	756	▾	−0.31%
071235021	Tugnao	5.5%	1,311	1,309	▴	0.01%
071235022	Villa Milagrosa	6.0%	1,422	1,273	▴	0.77%
	Total		23,858	23,287	▴	0.17%

=== List of Islands ===
- Bantigue
- Bogo
- Bonoon
- Budlaan
- Butan
- Gaus
- Lapinig Pequeño
- Lapinig Pequeño II
- Lapinig Grande
- Pamasuan
- Popoo
- Saguise
- Tilmobo

=== Climate ===
Climate data for President Carlos P. Garcia, Bohol
Month	Jan	Feb	Mar	Apr	May	Jun	Jul	Aug	Sep	Oct	Nov	Dec	Year
Mean daily maximum °C (°F)	28 (82)	28 (82)	29 (84)	31 (88)	31 (88)	30 (86)	30 (86)	30 (86)	30 (86)	29 (84)	29 (84)	28 (82)	29 (85)
Mean daily minimum °C (°F)	23 (73)	23 (73)	23 (73)	23 (73)	24 (75)	24 (75)	24 (75)	24 (75)	24 (75)	24 (75)	24 (75)	23 (73)	24 (74)
Average precipitation mm (inches)	98 (3.9)	82 (3.2)	96 (3.8)	71 (2.8)	104 (4.1)	129 (5.1)	101 (4.0)	94 (3.7)	99 (3.9)	135 (5.3)	174 (6.9)	143 (5.6)	1,326 (52.3)
Average rainy days	18.0	14.1	17.1	16.8	23.7	25.7	25.8	23.3	24.2	25.9	24.0	20.6	259.2
Source: Meteoblue

== Demographics ==
Population census of President Carlos P. Garcia
Year	Pop.	±% p.a.
1970	8,831	—
1975	16,597	+13.49%
1980	18,142	+1.80%
1990	21,173	+1.56%
1995	19,096	−1.92%
2000	20,744	+1.79%
2007	25,118	+2.67%
2010	23,287	−2.72%
2015	23,356	+0.06%
2020	23,625	+0.24%
2024	23,858	+0.24%
Source: Philippine Statistics Authority

== Economy ==
Poverty incidence of President Carlos P. Garcia (%)

Source: Philippine Statistics Authority

== Education ==
Secondary schools
  - Aguining National High School
  - Basiao High School
  - Bonbonon High School
  - Campamanog High School
  - Gaus High School
  - Holy Child Academy
  - Mayor Inocencio B. Mendez High School
Primary and Elementary Schools
  - Aguining Elementary School
  - Basiao Elementary School
  - Baud Elementary School
  - Bayog Elementary School
  - Bogo Elementary School
  - Bonbonon Elementary School
  - Butan Elementary School
  - Campamanog Elementary School
  - Canmangao Elementary School
  - Gaus Elementary School
  - Kabangkalan Primary School
  - Lapinig Elementary School
  - Lipata Elementary School
  - Popoo Elementary School
  - Pres. C. P. Garcia Central Elementary School
  - Saguise Elementary School
  - San Jose Elementary School
  - San Vicente Elementary School
  - Sto. Rosario Primary School
  - Tilmobo Primary School
  - Tugas Elementary School
  - Tugnao Elementary School
  - Villa Milagrosa Elementary School

== See also ==
- List of renamed cities and municipalities in the Philippines
