= Ubay National Science High School =

Public high school in Bohol, Philippines

Location
- E. Aumentado Avenue, Fatima; Ubay, Bohol 6315; Philippines; 10°02′40.5054″N 124°28′38.5392″E

Information
- School type: Government Funded, Public, Special Science
- Motto: Secundus ut Nullus (Second to None)
- Established: July 1, 1996
- Founder: Erico B. Aumentado
- Sister school: TCSHS
- School district: 2nd District of Bohol
- Principal: Martin C. Ramis
- Faculty: 56
- Key people: Dr. Clarita V. Alesna, Reynita Haduc
- Grades: 7 to 12
- Enrollment: 900+
- Education system: ESEP - DepEd
- Language: English, Filipino
- Campus: Urban
- Colors: Green, Yellow, Red, Blue
- Slogan: Science High, Aiming High
- Mascot: Sun-Sun
- Nickname: UNSHS, SciHigh
- Publication: The Explorer
- Yearbook: The Pioneer
- Affiliations: Department of Education - Division of Bohol
- Website: UNSHS

Ubay National Science High School (Filipino: Mataas na Pambansang Paaralang Pang-Agham ng Ubay), commonly called USci or SciHigh is a special public high school in the Philippines. The campus is located in the southern tip of Barangay Fatima in the municipality of Ubay in the province of Bohol. The school is duly administered by the Department of Education. It is the second science high school in Bohol, next to Tagbilaran City.

== History ==
The school was established through the collaborative efforts of education heads and political officials who dreamed to provide quality education for the students of Ubay and beyond. A year later after the success of creating a science high school in Tagbilaran City, the former Department of Education, Culture and Sports (DECS) - Region VII approved the establishment of the school in 1996, through the joined hands of then schools district supervisor Clarita V. Alesna, 2nd District Congressman Erico B. Aumentado and former municipal mayor Manuel B. Alesna.

On July 1, 1996, the school was formally opened wherein top elementary graduates of the municipality were enrolled to form the pioneer batch. The institution was first named Ubay Science and Laboratory High School.

At first, students and faculty members utilized the multi-purpose building in Ubay Central Elementary in Poblacion as their temporary shelter. Although the building was considerably small, the organization found a way to maximize the facility. It was later subdivided into five small rooms, which houses a single classroom, faculty room, small library, computer room and a mini-theater.

The first set of faculty members were Clarita V. Alesna, Reynita Haduc, Ricarlena Catacutan and Arlene Ocdenaria. Mrs. Reynita Haduc was the first school principal and led the campus on its first 7 years. The campus produced its first batch of graduates in 2000.

== The Campus ==
The present-day two-storey school building was built in 1998 to accommodate the growing population of the institution. It was formally inaugurated in June 1998. The site of school building was donated by the philanthropist Eutiquio del Valle, a grandson of former Bohol governor, Eutiquio Boyles.

The institution changed its name to Ubay Science High School, when the class opened in June 1998. It was later changed to Ubay National Science High School through the Republic Act No. 10034 in 2001 during the third regular session of the 14th Congress.

== Student life ==
=== Student organizations ===
- Supreme Student Government (SSG)
- Science Club
- Physics Club
- Mathematics Club
- English Club
