= San Miguel, Bohol =

Municipality in Bohol, Philippines

San Miguel
- Municipality
- Municipality of San Miguel
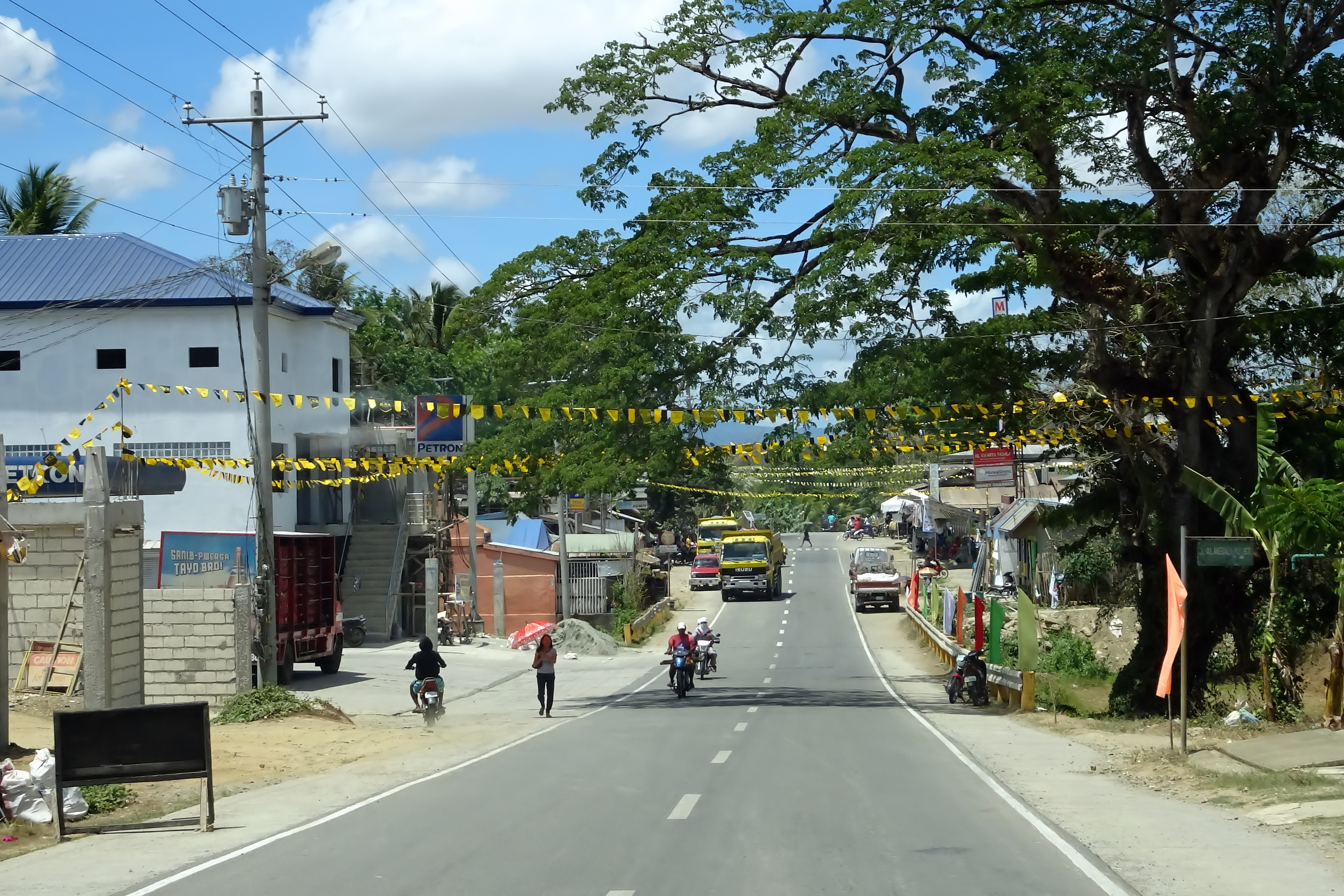
- San Miguel, Bohol

- Flag Seal

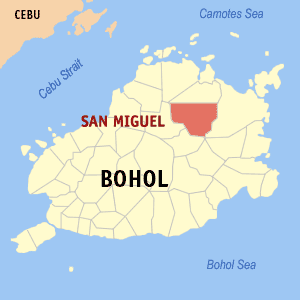
- Map of Bohol with San Miguel highlighted
- Interactive map of San Miguel
- Location within the Philippines
- Coordinates: 10°00′N 124°19′E
- Country: Philippines
- Region: Central Visayas
- Province: Bohol
- District: 2nd district
- Founded: 14 March 1961
- Named for: St. Michael the Archangel, Miguel Cambangay, Miguel Cresino
- Barangays: 18 (see Barangays)

Government
  - Type: Sangguniang Bayan
  - Mayor: Ian Gil G. Mendez
  - Vice Mayor: June Reign G. Reyes
  - Representative: Maria Vanessa Cadorna Aumentado
  - Municipal Council: Members: Terencio Palma; Ma. Irvin Mahumot; Gerry Garay; Atty. Timoteo Carcueva Jr.; Dario Nuez; Enrique Penaso; Christopher Gumapac; Delia Gupita
  - Electorate: 18,216 voters (2025)

Area
  - Total: 123.29 km^{2} (47.60 sq mi)
- Elevation: 45 m (148 ft)
- Highest elevation: 163 m (535 ft)
- Lowest elevation: 6 m (20 ft)

Population (2024 census)
  - Total: 26,124
  - Density: 211.89/km^{2} (548.79/sq mi)
  - Households: 5,937

Economy
  - Income class: 2nd municipal income class
  - Poverty incidence: 20.52% (2023)
  - Revenue: ₱ 202.1 million (2024)
  - Assets: ₱ 524.4 million (2024)
  - Expenditure: ₱ 131 million (2024)
  - Liabilities: ₱ 208.8 million (2024)

Service provider
  - Electricity: Bohol 2 Electric Cooperative (BOHECO 2)
- Time zone: UTC+8 (PST)
- ZIP code: 6323
- PSGC: 071238000
- IDD : area code: +63 (0)38
- Native languages: Boholano dialect Cebuano; Tagalog

San Miguel, officially the Municipality of San Miguel (Cebuano: Munisipalidad sa San Miguel; Tagalog: Bayan ng San Miguel), is a municipality in the province of Bohol, Philippines. According to the 2024 census, it has a population of 26,124 people.

The town of San Miguel, Bohol celebrates its feast on May 8, to honor the town patron Saint Michael.

== History ==
The Municipality was established in July 1961 by virtue of Executive Order No. 423 dated 14 March 1961. Its mother town is the municipality of Trinidad which also was formerly barrio Ipil of the Municipality of Talibon. The seat of government in the San Miguel was formerly Cambangay Sur which was formerly a part of Talibon when the latter became a pueblo during the Spanish regime.

The area that now serves as the town site was once a forested region abundant in wildlife. During the early years of the American period, a small number of settlers migrated from Ipil, a settlement located to the north along the Ipil River. In search of better opportunities, more migrants gradually moved into the area, with the majority coming from the municipality of Loon.

San Miguel got its name from St. Michael the Archangel, the town's patron saint.

== Geography ==
San Miguel is located in the northern interior of the province. The western portion of the municipality is generally hilly while the eastern portions are level lands primarily cultivated for agriculture. It is 87 kilometres (54 mi) from Tagbilaran. It has a total land area of 12,329 hectares (30,466 acres) bounded in the north by the municipality of Trinidad, in the south by the municipality of Dagohoy, in the west municipality of Danao and in the east by the municipality of Ubay.

=== Barangays ===
San Miguel is politically subdivided into 18 barangays. Each barangay consists of puroks and some have sitios.

PSGC	Barangay	Population			±% p.a.		Area		PD 2024	
		2024		2010			ha	acre	/km^{2}	/sq mi
071238001	Bayongan	8.7%	2,281	2,251	▴	0.09%	1,250	3,089	180	470
071238003	Bugang	4.9%	1,287	1,111	▴	1.03%	444	1,097	290	750
071238004	Cabangahan	2.6%	671	785	▾	−1.08%	345	853	190	500
071238012	Caluasan	2.1%	550	679	▾	−1.45%	526	1,300	100	270
071238006	Camanaga	6.3%	1,648	1,705	▾	−0.24%	670	1,656	250	640
071238007	Cambangay Norte	6.3%	1,635	1,566	▴	0.30%	847	2,093	190	500
071238008	Capayas	4.0%	1,032	1,033	▾	−0.01%	591	1,460	170	450
071238009	Corazon	7.8%	2,037	1,691	▴	1.30%	844	2,086	240	630
071238010	Garcia	2.4%	619	646	▾	−0.30%	581	1,436	110	280
071238011	Hagbuyo	4.8%	1,254	1,214	▴	0.23%	365	902	340	890
071238005	Kagawasan	4.8%	1,242	1,190	▴	0.30%	817	2,019	150	390
071238013	Mahayag	9.2%	2,411	2,329	▴	0.24%	501	1,238	480	1,200
071238014	Poblacion	9.4%	2,459	2,514	▾	−0.15%	357	882	690	1,800
071238015	San Isidro	6.3%	1,649	1,541	▴	0.47%	471	1,164	350	910
071238016	San Jose	3.2%	823	827	▾	−0.03%	241	596	340	880
071238017	San Vicente	2.9%	750	734	▴	0.15%	252	623	300	770
071238018	Santo Niño	2.8%	721	695	▴	0.26%	445	1,100	160	420
071238019	Tomoc	4.1%	1,066	1,063	▴	0.02%	870	2,150	120	320
	Total		26,124	23,574	▴	0.72%	12,329	30,466	210	13

=== Climate ===
Climate data for San Miguel, Bohol
Month	Jan	Feb	Mar	Apr	May	Jun	Jul	Aug	Sep	Oct	Nov	Dec	Year
Mean daily maximum °C (°F)	28 (82)	28 (82)	29 (84)	31 (88)	31 (88)	30 (86)	30 (86)	30 (86)	30 (86)	29 (84)	29 (84)	28 (82)	29 (85)
Mean daily minimum °C (°F)	23 (73)	23 (73)	23 (73)	23 (73)	24 (75)	24 (75)	24 (75)	24 (75)	24 (75)	24 (75)	24 (75)	23 (73)	24 (74)
Average precipitation mm (inches)	98 (3.9)	82 (3.2)	96 (3.8)	71 (2.8)	104 (4.1)	129 (5.1)	101 (4.0)	94 (3.7)	99 (3.9)	135 (5.3)	174 (6.9)	143 (5.6)	1,326 (52.3)
Average rainy days	18.0	14.1	17.1	16.8	23.7	25.7	25.8	23.3	24.2	25.9	24.0	20.6	259.2
Source: Meteoblue

== Demographics ==
Population census of San Miguel
Year	Pop.	±% p.a.
1970	10,051	—
1975	11,117	+2.04%
1980	12,220	+1.91%
1990	16,775	+3.22%
1995	17,979	+1.31%
2000	20,828	+3.20%
2007	22,199	+0.88%
2010	23,574	+2.21%
2015	24,135	+0.45%
2020	25,356	+1.04%
2024	26,124	+0.72%
Source: Philippine Statistics Authority

== Economy ==
Poverty incidence of San Miguel (%)

Source: Philippine Statistics Authority

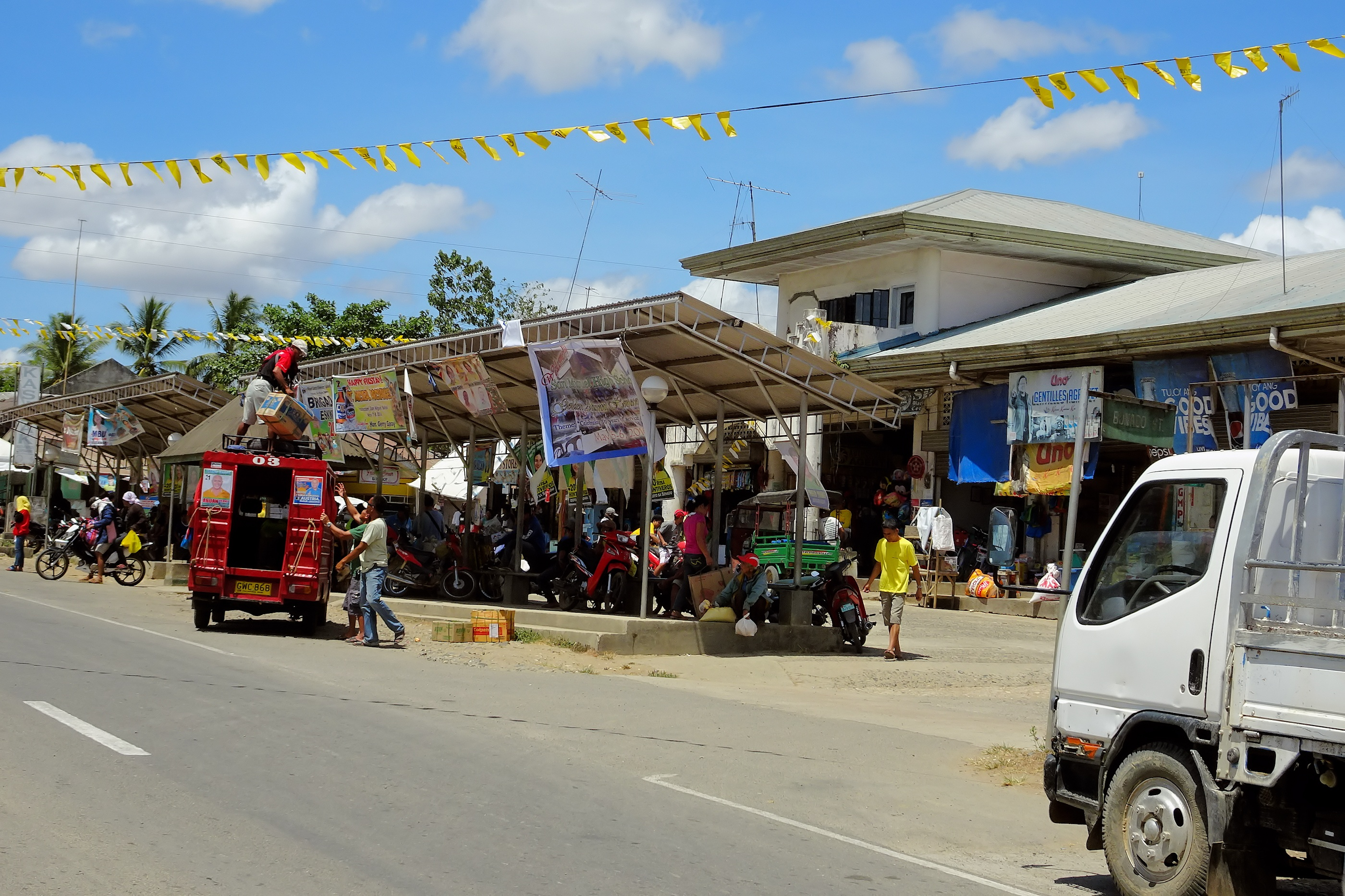
San Miguel market

== Government ==
Since its township, 12 mayors have been elected into office.

=== Mayors of San Miguel ===
- Don Jose Pepe Alvarez
- Enrique Alvarez
- Mateo Almedilla
- Teodorico Palma
- Mauricio Bonior
- Segundino Hencianos Sr.
- Hermogenes Ricafort Sr.
  (acted as OIC Mayor after the EDSA Revolution)
- Silvino Evangelista
- Claudio Bonior
- Nunila Mendez-Pinat
- Atty. Virgilio Mendez
- Ian Gil Mendez
