= List of historical markers of the Philippines in Zamboanga Peninsula =

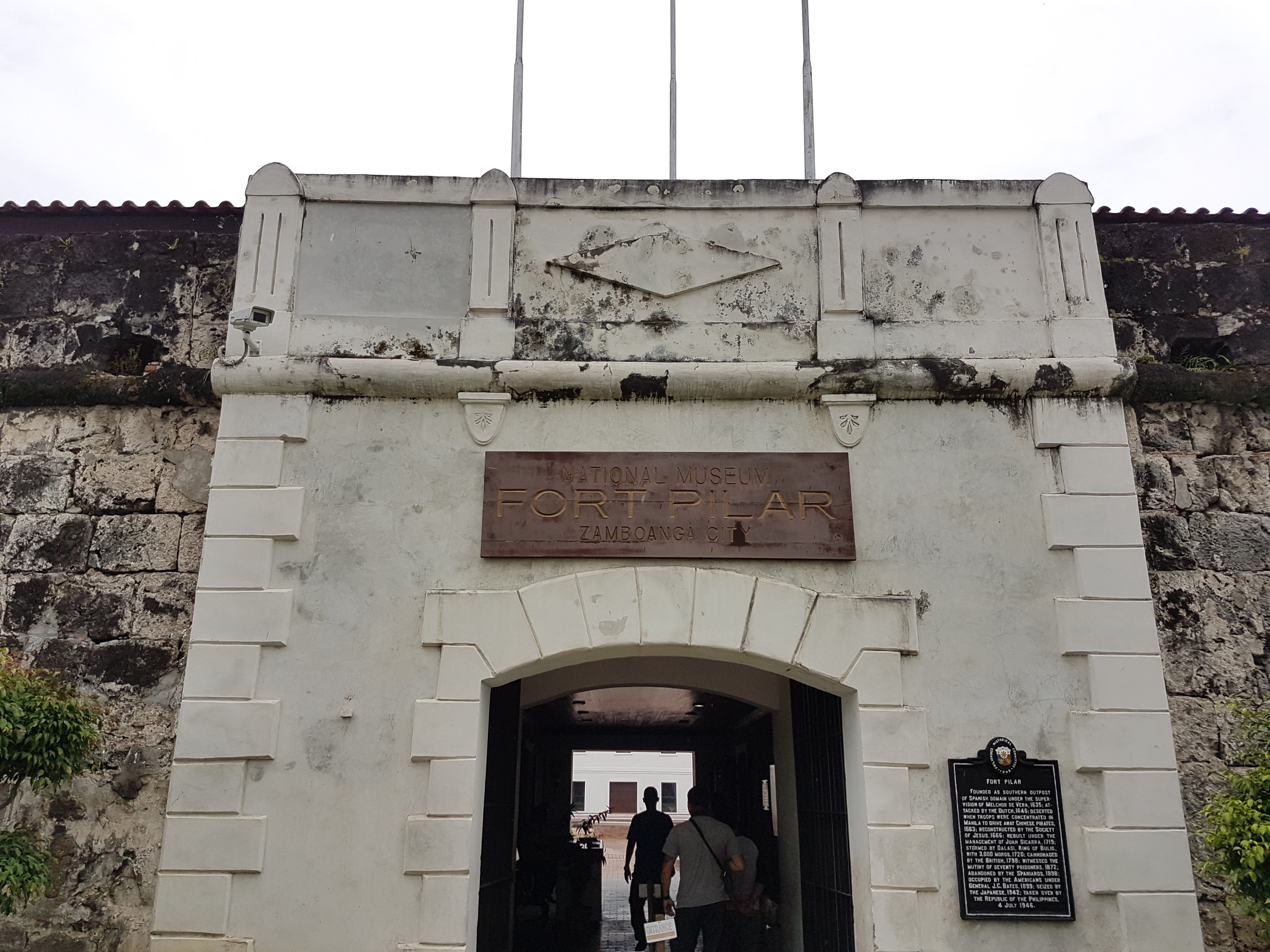
Main entrance of Fort Pilar with its historical marker in Zamboanga City

This list of historical markers installed by the National Historical Commission of the Philippines (NHCP) in Zamboanga Peninsula (Region IX) is an annotated list of people, places, or events in the region that have been commemorated by cast-iron plaques issued by the said commission. The plaques themselves are permanent signs installed in publicly visible locations on buildings, monuments, or in special locations.

While many Cultural Properties have historical markers installed, not all places marked with historical markers are designated into one of the particular categories of Cultural Properties.

This article lists 31 markers from the Zamboanga Region, including six (6) that are part of the Quincentennial historical markers series.

== Basilan ==
This table lists one marker from Isabela in the province of Basilan. The rest of the island province is part of Bangsamoro.

Marker title	Description	Location	Language	Date issued	Image
Tagima (Basilan); Ruta ng Ekspedisyong Magallanes–Elcano sa Pilipinas (Note: Tagima (Basilan): Route of the Magellan–Elcano Expedition in the Philippines)	From Sulu, the expedition landed here on the way to Maluku.	Isabela City	Filipino	November 11, 2021	

== Sulu ==
This table lists four markers from the province of Sulu.

Marker title	Description	Location	Language	Date issued	Image
Hadji Butu Abdul Bagui	Statesman from Jolo. Born in 1865. Became a senator. Became a member of the Board of National Language (representing Mindanao and Sulu).	Jolo (currently within NHCP storage)	Filipino		
Labanan sa Bud Dajo (Note: Battle of Bud Dajo)	Massacre committed by American forces against Moro rebellion. Part of the Moro Rebellion, Philippine–American War.	Sulu Capitol Grounds, Jolo	Filipino	March 8, 2006	
Prinsesa Tarhata Kiram (Note: Princess Tarhata Kiram)		Jolo		August 10, 1984	
Sulu; Ruta ng Ekspedisyong Magallanes–Elcano sa Pilipinas (Note: Sulu: Route of the Magellan–Elcano Expedition in the Philippines)		Jolo	Filipino	October 11, 2021	

== Zamboanga City ==
This table lists twelve markers from the highly urbanized Zamboanga City.

Marker title	Description	Location	Language	Date issued	Image
Bahay-Pamahalaan ng Lungsod ng Zamboanga (Dating Panlalawigang Kapitolyo ng Zamboanga) (Note: Zamboanga City Hall (Former Provincial Capitol of Zamboanga))	Built by the federal government of the United States from 1905 to 1907.	Zamboanga City	Filipino	1969	
Bank of the Philippine Islands Zamboanga	First branch of BPI in Zamboanga; residence of Gen. John Pershing, military-governor of the Moro Province	Zamboanga City	Filipino	2012	
Cawit; Ruta ng Ekspedisyon Magallanes–Elcano sa Pilipinas (Note: Cawit: Route of the Magellan–Elcano Expedition in the Philippines)	Pigafetta described the place where an exceptional type of cinnamon grew.	Cawit Elementary School, Brgy. Cawit, Zamboanga City	Filipino	December 27, 2021	
Cesar Cortes Climaco (1916–1984)	Mayor of Zamboanga City from 1953 to 1961.	Zamboanga City	Filipino	2009	
Fort Pilar	Founded as a southern outpost of the Spanish under the supervision of Melchor de Vera in 1635. Attacked by the Dutch in 1646.	Zamboanga City	English	1949	
Gusali ng Zamboanga Normal School (Note: Zamboanga Normal School Building)	First normal school building in Mindanao; became the Western Mindanao State University.	College of Teacher Education Building, Western Mindanao State University, Normal Road, Zamboanga City	Filipino	April 30, 2024	
Manalipa; Ruta ng Ekspedisyon Magallanes–Elcano sa Pilipinas (Note: Manalipa: Route of the Magellan–Elcano Expedition in the Philippines)	Where the Magellan expedition encountered people living in boats (bangkang lepat).	Manalipa Island, Zamboanga City	Filipino	March 21, 2022	
San Ramon Prison and Penal Farm	First became a prison during Spanish times, became a prison by the Japanese during WWII.	Zamboanga City	Filipino	November 13, 2014	
Subanin; Ruta ng Ekspedisyon Magallanes–Elcano sa Pilipinas (Note: Subanin: Route of the Magellan–Elcano Expedition in the Philippines)	Where the Magellan expedition encountered a community of Subanen.	RT Lim Boulevard, Brgy San Jose Cawa-cawa, Zamboanga City	Filipino	March 21, 2022	
Taluksangay Mosque	Oldest mosque in Zamboanga Peninsula, built by Hadji Abdullah Maas Nuno in 1885.	Taluksangay, Zamboanga City	Filipino	February 25, 1992	
Vicente S. Alvarez (1862–1942)	Revolutionary general, led the surrender of the Spaniards in Zamboanga.	Zamboanga City	Filipino	2010	
Zamboanga Beach	Where the US 41st division landed to liberate the city of Zamboanga from the Japanese.	Zamboanga City	English	1952	

== Zamboanga del Norte ==
This table lists 12 markers from the province of Zamboanga del Norte.

Marker title	Description	Location	Language	Date issued	Image
(untitled)	Church built by the Jesuits in 1883. Where José Rizal stood while hearing mass every Sunday during his exile.	Dapitan	Filipino and English	1989	
Ang Casa Real (Note: The Royal House)	Where Rizal lived while he was in exile. Official residence of the politico-military general.	Dapitan	Filipino and English	1989	
Bahay ni Don Mariano Balsamo Hamoy (Note: House of Don Mariano Balsamo Hamoy)	Business partners Rizal and Hamoy used the house storage for abaca.	Balay Hamoy Museum, Mi Retiro St.	Filipino	October 14, 2024	
Site Where Rizal Landed	Where Rizal landed during the night of July 17, 1892 to his place of exile.	Dapitan	Filipino and English	1989	
Dr. Jose Rizal (1861–1896)	Shore where Rizal left on July 31, 1896, in Dapitan ending his four years in exile.	Dapitan	Filipino	July 31, 1996	
Dr. Jose Rizal Memorial Hospital	Hospital was established on June 19, 1916. This is where José Rizal lived when he was banished in Dapitan in 1892. Transferred to present site in 1991.	Lawaan, Dapitan City	Filipino	July 13, 2017	
Jose Rizal; 1861–1896	Replica of the house constructed by Rizal. He lived here from March 1893 to July 31, 1896.	Dapitan	English	1962	
Kipit; Ruta ng Ekspedisyong Magallanes–Elcano sa Pilipinas (Note: Kipit: Route of the Magellan–Elcano Expedition in the Philippines)	Rajah Calanao made a blood compact with Juan Carvallo, leader of the expedition. Where the expedition became aware that Luzon was actively trading with Ryukyu.	Brgy. Kipit, Labason	Filipino	May 7, 2021	
Liwasan ng Dapitan (Note: Dapitan Park)	Plaza planned by Rizal while he was exiled from 1892 to 1896. Contains a relief map of Mindanao.	Dapitan	Filipino	2003	
Ang Lumang Bayan ng Dapitan (Note: The Old Town of Dapitan)	Designated as a heritage zone by the NHCP.	Dapitan	Filipino	2011	
Ang Pagdalaw ni Valenzuela sa Dapitan (Note: The Visit of Valenzuela in Dapitan)	Site where Pio Valenzuela visited Rizal in Dapitan to consult for plans.	Dapitan	Filipino	June 19, 1981	
Sakahan ni Jose Rizal (Note: Farm of Jose Rizal)	The farmland that Rizal bought and cultivated during his years in exile.	Katipunan	Filipino	1998	

== Zamboanga del Sur ==
This table lists two markers from the province of Zamboanga del Sur.

Marker title	Description	Location	Language	Date issued	Image
Katubigan ng Golpo ng Moro; Ruta ng Ekspedisyon Magallanes–Elcano sa Pilipinas (Note: Waters of the Moro Gulf: Route of the Magellan–Elcano Expedition in the Philippines)	Magellan expedition fleet came from the waters of Cauit and Monoripa and the Subanin.	Pagadian City Fish Port, Brgy. San Pedro, Pagadian	Filipino	December 22, 2021	
Mga Guho ng Kuta ng Tukuran (Note: Ruins of the Fort of Tukuran)	Site of the village of Sultan Untung turned into a Spanish fort.	Tukuran	Filipino	October 28, 2014	

== Zamboanga Sibugay ==
There are no markers from the province of Zamboanga Sibugay.

== See also ==
- List of Cultural Properties of the Philippines in Zamboanga Peninsula

== Bibliography ==
- National Historical Institute (1994). Historical Markers: Regions V-XIII. National Historical Institute.
- National Historical Institute (2008). Historical Markers (1992–2006). National Historical Institute.
- A list of sites and structures with historical markers, as of 16 January 2012
- A list of institutions with historical markers, as of 16 January 2012
