= List of Cultural Properties of the Philippines in Zamboanga Peninsula =

This list contains an overview of the government recognized Cultural Properties of the Philippines in Zamboanga Peninsula. The list is based on the official lists provided by the National Commission on Culture and the Arts, National Historical Commission of the Philippines and the National Museum of the Philippines.

| Cultural Property wmph identifier (Note: wmph is an internal identifier used by Wikimedia Philippines to identify the monument. This is not an official identifier, and only shown temporarily in the templates until the government creates an updated complete list.) | Site name | Description | Province | City or municipality | Address | Coordinates | Image |
|---|---|---|---|---|---|---|---|
| PH-09-0001 | Taluksangay Mosque | | — | Zamboanga City | Taluksanggay | 6°57′03″N 122°10′53″E | Upload file |
| PH-09-0002 | Ayuntamiento de Zamboanga | | — | Zamboanga City | N.S. Valderosa Street | 6°54′15″N 122°04′34″E | Upload file |
| PH-09-0003 | Fortaleza del Pilar | | — | Zamboanga City | | 6°54′04″N 122°04′56″E | More images |
| PH-09-0004 | Rizal Shrine | | Zamboanga del Norte | Dapitan | | | More images |
| PH-09-0005 | Dapitan Plaza | | Zamboanga del Norte | Dapitan | | | Upload file |
| PH-09-0006 | Old Town of Dapitan | | Zamboanga del Norte | Dapitan | | | Upload file |
| PH-09-0007 | St. James Church | | Zamboanga del Norte | Dapitan | Fr. Sanchez Street | 8°39′17″N 123°25′29″E | More images |
| PH-09-0008 | Rizal Departure Site | | Zamboanga del Norte | Dapitan | Sunset Boulevard | 8°39′22″N 123°25′10″E | Upload file |
| PH-09-0009 | Casa Real | | Zamboanga del Norte | Dapitan | | | Upload file |
| PH-09-0010 | Relief Map of Mindanao | | Zamboanga del Norte | Dapitan | | | Upload file |
| PH-09-0011 | Jose Rizal Farm | | Zamboanga del Norte | Katipunan | | | Upload file |

== See also ==
- List of historical markers of the Philippines in Zamboanga Peninsula
