= Silino =

Silino may refer to:

- Silino District, a district of the federal city of Moscow, Russia
- Silino (rural locality), several rural localities in Russia
- Silino, historical name of Selinog, the island barangay in the Philippines coterminous with Silino Island
