= Dr. Jose Rizal Memorial Hospital =

Government hospital in Zamboanga del Norte, Philippines

Geography
- Location: Dapitan, Zamboanga del Norte, Zamboanga Peninsula, Philippines
- Coordinates: 8°38′21″N 123°24′55″E

Organization
- Funding: Government hospital
- Type: Level 1 hospital

Services
- Beds: 200

History
- Former names: Rizal Memorial Hospital; Rizal Memorial District Hospital
- Opened: June 19, 1916; 109 years ago

Links
- Website: djrmh.doh.gov.ph

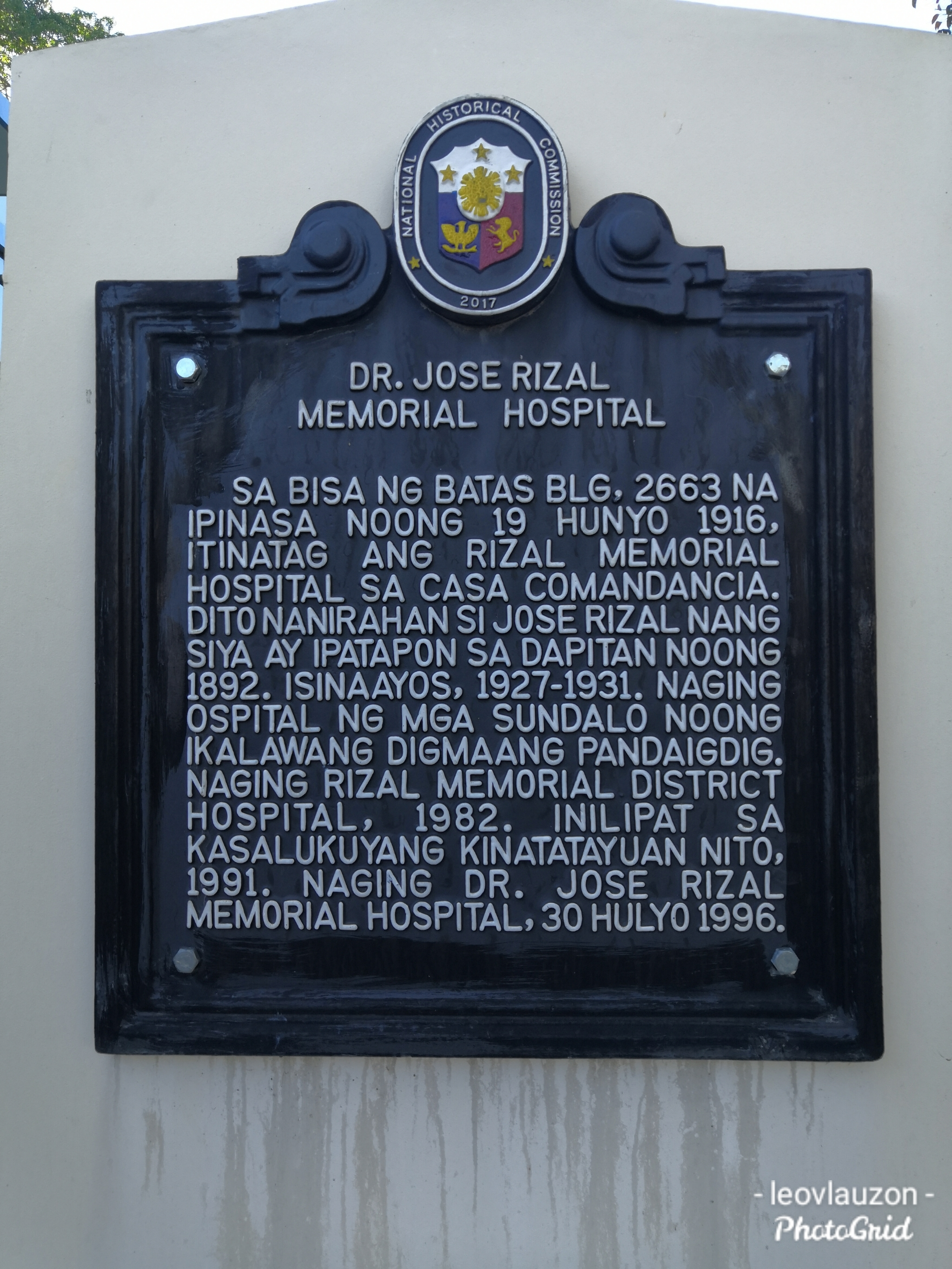
NHCP marker on the hospital grounds, 2017

The Dr. Jose Rizal Memorial Hospital is a Level 1 government hospital in the Philippines with an authorized bed capacity of two hundred (200). It is located in Dapitan, Zamboanga del Norte.
