= Silino (rural locality) =

Silino (Russian: Силино) is the name of several rural localities in Russia:

- Silino, Kaluga Oblast, a selo in Meshchovsky District of Kaluga Oblast
- Silino, Kemerovo Oblast, a selo in Yelykayevskaya Rural Territory of Kemerovsky District in Kemerovo Oblast; 55°16′N 86°17′E
- Silino, Kirov Oblast, a village in Smetaninsky Rural Okrug of Sanchursky District in Kirov Oblast; 56°55′N 47°11′E
- Silino, Leningrad Oblast, a village in Krasnoozernoye Settlement Municipal Formation of Priozersky District in Leningrad Oblast; 60°33′N 29°37′E
- Silino, Republic of Mordovia, a selo in Silinsky Selsoviet of Ardatovsky District in the Republic of Mordovia; 54°59′N 46°02′E
- Silino, Moscow Oblast, a village in Ashitkovskoye Rural Settlement of Voskresensky District in Moscow Oblast; 55°26′N 38°43′E
- Silino, Diveyevsky District, Nizhny Novgorod Oblast, a village in Ivanovsky Selsoviet of Diveyevsky District in Nizhny Novgorod Oblast; 55°14′N 43°25′E
- Silino, Shatkovsky District, Nizhny Novgorod Oblast, a selo in Silinsky Selsoviet of Shatkovsky District in Nizhny Novgorod Oblast; 55°06′N 44°22′E
- Silino, Tula Oblast, a village in Samarskaya Volost of Kurkinsky District in Tula Oblast
- Silino, Tver Oblast, a village in Mogilevskoye Rural Settlement of Kuvshinovsky District in Tver Oblast
- Silino, Vologda Oblast, a village in Staroselsky Selsoviet of Vologodsky District in Vologda Oblast
