= José Rizal's farm =

Historic site in Zamboanga del Norte, Philippines

Sakahan ni Jose Rizal
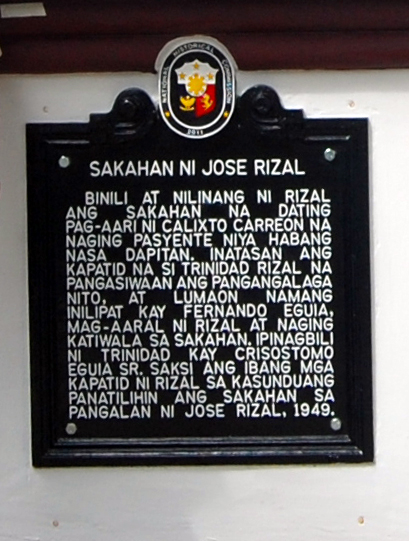
- Historical Marker for Rizal Farm
- Town/City: Katipunan
- Province: Zamboanga del Norte
- Country: Philippines
- Coordinates: 8°30′04″N 123°17′48″E
- Owner: Eguia family
- Area: 40 hectares (99 acres)
- Status: Open to the public

The farm of José Rizal (Filipino: Sakahan ni Jose Rizal) is a designated historic site in Katipunan, Zamboanga del Norte, Philippines.

== Origin ==
When Dr. Jose Rizal reported to Dapitan in Mindanao from 1892 to 1896 by the Spanish government, aside from spending some time in teaching the town folks, he also engaged in medical practice through which he was able to cure the eye ailment of Calixto Carreon. The story said that Carreon offered Rizal the 40-hectare (99-acre) land as a way to repay him. Dr. Rizal accepted Calixto's offer, but insisted on a payment of ₱200, which he had won in a lottery organized by the Spanish. Rizal planted coconuts, hemp, sugar cane, and fruit trees on his farm.

In order to keep the farm under proper management, Rizal designated one of his sisters, Trinidad, to look after the farm. After several years, Trinidad passed the farm's management to Fernando Eguía, one of Dr. Rizal's students. A marker was installed in the area by the National Historical Institute (NHI) which states that Trinidad sold the land to Crisostomo Eguía Sr., son of Fernando. It was agreed right there and then after the sale that the land would still be registered under the name of Rizal. Other siblings of Rizal also witnessed such agreement.

At present days, the farm is under the care of the children of Crisostomo Eguia Sr. On a positive note, Director Mary June Bugante of the Department of Tourism Region 9 said her office is constantly in touch with Eguia Family to encourage them to transform the farm into a duly recognized tourist destination.

== See also ==
- José Rizal Memorial Protected Landscape
