= Silino, Vologda Oblast =

Silino Силино
- Village
- Location within Vologda Oblast Location within Russia
- Coordinates: 59°11′N 39°28′E
- Country: Russia
- Region: Vologda Oblast
- District: Vologodsky District
- Time zone: UTC+3:00

Silino (Russian: Силино) is a rural locality (a village) in Staroselskoye Rural Settlement, Vologodsky District, Vologda Oblast, Russia. The population was 9 as of 2002.

== Geography ==
Silino is located 32 km west of Vologda (the district's administrative centre) by road. Kuchino is the nearest rural locality.
