= Manalipa =

- Island Barangay
- Location of Manalipa Island in the Philippines
- Coordinates: 6°53′8″N 122°16′55″E
- Country: Philippines
- Region: Zamboanga Peninsula
- City: Zamboanga City
- Barangay: Manalipa

Population (August 1, 2007)
  - Total: 1,674

Manalipa (also known as Malanipa) is one of the 28 offshore islands of the City of Zamboanga in southern Philippines. Located about 0.5 kilometres (0.31 mi) east of the southern tip of the island is Little Manalipa Island (also known as Little Malanipa Island).

== Location ==
The island is located about 25 kilometres (16 mi) east of downtown Zamboanga City, and 8 kilometres (5.0 mi) southeast of Sacol Island, on the Moro Gulf.

== Communities ==
The barangay of Manalipa, the lone community on the island, has population of 1,674 (as of August 1, 2007).

== Features ==
Scuba diving is very good around the island.

== See also ==
- List of islands of the Philippines
