= Tarhata Kiram =

Muslim Filipina leader

- Dayang Dayang
- Born: 1904; Jolo, Sultanate of Sulu
- Died: 23 May 1979 (aged 74–75); Quezon City, Philippines
- House: Kiram
- Father: Datu Atik Kiram

Princess Tarhata Kiram was a Moro leader. She was the niece and adopted daughter of Jamamul Kiram II, Sultan of Sulu. After being educated in Manila and the United States, she returned to Jolo and married a Moro chieftain, Datu Tahil. In 1927, they staged a brief, failed rebellion against the corruption and excessive land taxation of American-supported Filipino governmental authorities. Kiram worked throughout her life to protect the economic and political rights of Muslim Filipinos.

== Early life and education ==
Tarhata Kiram was born in 1904 on the island of Jolo. Her father was Datu Atik Kiram. It is documented that Sayyid Capt. Kalingalan Caluang's mother, Apoh Hj. Norma, assumed the role of wet nurse for Princess Tarhata Kiram. From birth, she held the title Dayang Dayang (Princess).

Due to her position in a noble family, Kiram received scholarships to study in Manila and, eventually, abroad. Filipino and American officials in the new colonial government sought to educate certain Muslim youth into a heavily American-influenced, Christian Filipino culture. They hoped these elite children, the next generation of Moro leaders, would be able to "civilize" their Muslim brethren in the Southern islands where the former Spanish colonial masters never succeeded in exerting much control. In this way, Filipino nationalists hoped to advance the goal of unifying all the Philippine islands into one nation.

At the age of 10, Kiram was sent North to Manila to study at the exclusive Normal School where she studied domestic arts. Here she became close with one of her teachers, Doña Mercedes Lina Rivera, who went on to co-found, with six other Filipina educators, Philippine Women's College. Upon graduation from Normal School, through the sponsorship of Governor Frank Carpenter, the United States Bureau of Insular Affairs offered support for further post-secondary study abroad.

== University of Illinois, 1919–1924 ==
Kiram chose to attend the University of Illinois in Urbana-Champaign, Illinois. Her uncle, the Sultan of Sulu, reportedly objected to her going to the United States, fearing she would return thoroughly Americanized.

Kiram attended the University of Illinois between 1919 and 1924. This made her the first Muslim woman from the Philippine Islands to attend a U.S. university. She arrived in August 1919 with roommate Carmen Aguinaldo, revolutionary leader Emilio Aguinaldo's daughter.

Both Kiram's course of study and extracurricular activities were closely monitored by the Bureau of Insular Affairs and the Department of Interior, in Washington D.C., as well as, from the Philippines, Governor Carpenter. In addition to cultivating her domestic skills, they were preparing Kiram to lead graduates of the Jolo girls' school in community work. To prepare her to be a "lady" fit for such a position, Kiram studied piano and voice.

Kiram began her studies in the School of Music before moving over to the College of Liberal Arts and Sciences. She took up the appearance and activities of a normal American college student and became popular on campus. Her love of dancing and parties earned her the nickname "the One and Only Sulu flapper."

Kiram played with stereotypes, as well. She liked to jokingly threaten she might "run amuck," or engage in a suicidal rampage, a commonly held stereotype of Southeast Asian Muslim people. This earned her an additional nickname: "Hattie the Headhunter."

Reporting on her supposed rejection of Muslim culture as "silly," Kiram's case was seen as evidence of how easily the Moro people might be transformed through education. At one point, Governor Frank Carpenter worried Kiram's assimilation into American culture had become so complete she might not want to return home to her people.

== Return to Sulu ==
Kiram returned to Jolo in 1924 without receiving a degree from the University of Illinois. By this time, Frank Carpenter, the governor who had sponsored her education, had fallen from power. The Bureau of Non-Christian Tribes gave her the job of "government agent." Though she worked with local charities, her broader position involved acting as a liaison between the local Muslims and the Philippine government. She and her aunt, Dayang Dayang Hadji Piandao performed this job together.

In Jolo, Kiram established a Muslim-Christian women's club whose main mission involved performing charity work. During this time, before her marriage, she also taught at a school in Jolo.

Several letters from immediately after her return indicate warm feelings toward the United States and resistance to the possibility of marrying a Moro man with multiple wives. Soon, however, she grew her hair out long, filed her teeth, and began adopting other local customs.

In 1926, Tarhata Kiram became the fourth wife of the much older Moro chieftain Datu Tahil, son of Datu Jokonain and veteran leader of the 1913 Battle of Bud Bagsak. Her uncle, Sultan Jamulul Kiram II, objected to the marriage on the grounds that she would be Datu Tahil’s fourth wife and that he had not provided an adequate dowry.

=== 1927 uprising ===
Soon after their marriage in 1926, the couple instigated a rebellion on the island of Jolo. They protested the high land taxes the Filipino colonial authorities sought to impose on the people. Though similar rebellions had gone on for decades in the burgeoning nation-state's predominantly Muslim southern islands, Kiram's having been educated in the United States led to much media attention. As Oliver Charbonneau, a historian of American foreign relations, explained: "The colonial fantasy of the Moro's journey from jungle primitive to modern subject reached its apex in the figure of Princess Tarhata Kiram." Her anti-colonialist rebellion came as a disappointing shock to Americans. Many viewed her case as evidence that the Muslims of the Philippines could not be educated into obedient subjects.

In January 1927, hundreds of Datu Tahil's followers joined Tarhata Kiram and her husband in a prolonged standoff with the Philippine Constabulary at a cotta (fort) in Patikul. Some say it was Kiram who encouraged her husband to build the fort after her efforts to secure him the governorship of Jolo failed. An American officer named Major Malone was also involved in encouraging and helping plot the rebellion. Kiram acted as sometime translator between Malone and her husband.

The New York Times reported Tahil's followers numbered over 300 and that Philippine authorities had enlisted the support of other Moro leaders and were prepared to use tear gas. The Filipinos were unwilling to attack for fear that killing Kiram may spark a revolution among the Moro people.

The Philippine officers held off on attacking until they heard Kiram had escaped, via tunnel, on January 27. When they finally raided the cotta, 35 of Tahil's followers were killed. They captured Kiram on February 4, 1927. She was described as tired and sick upon being detained and charged with sedition. At the time of her capture, the search for her husband, who the government wanted to charge with sedition, was ongoing.

Upon his capture, Datu Tahil was tried for sedition and sentenced to seven years in prison. During the trial, testimony revealed that Datu Tahil was aided by an American officer, Major Malone, who had given him rifles and 600 rounds of ammunition to encourage Tahil’s plans to stage an uprising. According to Jolo Governor Moore’s testimony, the uprising began due to an altercation between Datu Tahil and Datu Uddin over who would wield more power in the region. Datu Tahil had offended Datu Uddin by divorcing Uddin’s daughter, Princess Korona, in order to take Tarhata Kiram as his fourth wife.

=== Post-uprising media attention ===
Kiram met Datu Tahil in Cebu before he was sent to Bilibid prison in Manila. She, apparently, looked much aged by the ordeal. Though unclear when or how it happened, the couple divorced.

The Atlanta Constitution also reported that when Kiram was visited in a one-room hut on the edge of the jungle, she appeared much older than her twenty-two years. She wore a brightly colored sarong and had a baby crying in a net-covered crib. The interviewer noted that Kiram "appeared to be perfectly contended" with her new life.

When asked how she could have undergone such a drastic change so soon after living the life of an American college student, she replied: "I know that all this must seem very strange to my many friends across the Pacific, but if I am to use my education for the good of my people, I must live as they do." She added, with some passion, that "Since America took away the bolos and the barongs, weapons the Sulu needs to keep his old enemy, the Filipino, from walking all over him, some one must help him retain his standing in the South Sea. I am going to do what I can."

Kiram wrote an editorial for the Los Angeles Times explaining the uprising and her role in it. She explained the undemocratic nature of Sulu Governor Carl Moore carrying out the duties of multiple government offices, including school superintendent and justice of the peace. She cited her American education as having taught her that the "true essence of free government is that all powers should not be vested in one man."

She remarked on the great irony that colonial powers often have the most trouble with educated segments of the colonized population which the colonizers have, themselves, educated. She wrote: "It is axiomatic that you cannot make a slave of a man after educating him." Kiram explained her adoption of traditional clothing and customs as part of her becoming a powerful leader for her people in the face of impending Filipino dominance.

== Political career ==
Kiram remained active in political affairs throughout the American occupation of the Philippines. In 1927, she joined Senator Hadji Butu Rasul in rejecting an attempt to exclude the Sulu Archipelago from being considered part of Mindanao.

In July 1958, Kiram met with President Carlos P. Garcia to discuss the poverty and unrest in Sulu. Meeting notes reveal the decision to abandon the iron fist methods unsuccessfully attempted by the previous American and Spanish colonial powers. Parties agreed to a soft power approach using the influence of Kiram and the sultans, datus, and imams to promote the peace, including the regulation of unlicensed firearms.

In an October 9, 1960 speech to the University of Chicago Alumni Association, Philippine Secretary of National Defense Alejo S. Santos mentioned Tarhata Kiram in his plea for help with the economic development of Sulu. Santos said:

In passing, it is fitting to mention at this juncture the magnificent efforts of a refined lady in Sulu who is obsessed with an ambition to improve the lot of the Muslim people. She is aware of the appalling conditions of poverty, ignorance, and economic stagnation which are plaguing the Sulu archipelago. She knows how neglect, indifference, apathy, and civic ineptitude have spawned and continue to provide fertile grounds for her own people to be misunderstood. At this very moment I can envision the frail and delicate frame of Princess Tarhata Kiram determinedly fighting with a stout heart her battle against so many odds.

Kiram attempted to run for the Philippine Senate in 1969, but the Nacionalista Party rejected her candidacy. The move signaled a continued lack of interest in prioritizing Filipino Muslim issues and representation.

In the mid-1970s, she was appointed member of the AFP Southwest Command (SOWESCOM) Advisory Council, and later served as consultant on Islamic affairs in the Office of the Regional Commissioner for Region IX under Rear Admiral Romulo Espaldon.

== Personal life ==
Kiram re-married twice. Her first husband was Datu Buyungan. Her second husband was Francisco Salvador, a Christian lawyer, engineer, and accountant from Dalaguete, Cebu. Her children were Puti Denchurain and Datu Agham Kiram.

She also composed music. One of her most famous songs was "Jolo Farewell."

== Death and posthumous honors ==
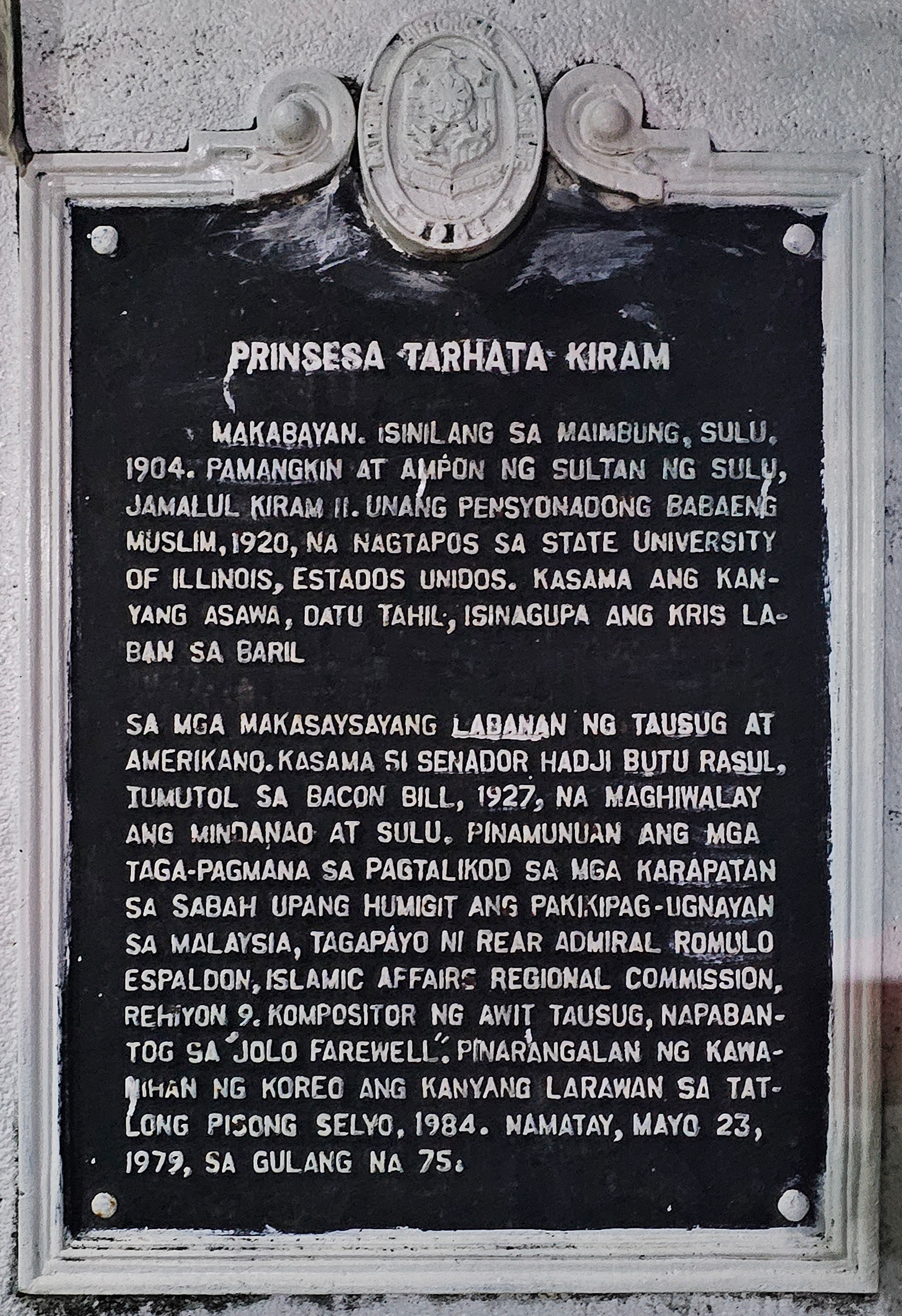
National historical marker installed in 1984 in Jolo, Sulu

Princess Tarhata Kiram died of heart failure on May 23, 1979 at Veterans Memorial Hospital in Quezon City.

In 1984, the National Historical Institute erected a marker in her hometown, Jolo, to honor Kiram’s lifelong dedication to fighting for the interests of Muslim Filipinos. In the same year, the Philippine government printed her portrait on the 3 peso stamp.
