= José Rizal Memorial Protected Landscape =

Park and memorial in Dapitan, Mindanao, Philippines

- Rizal Park and Shrine
- IUCN category V (protected landscape/seascape)
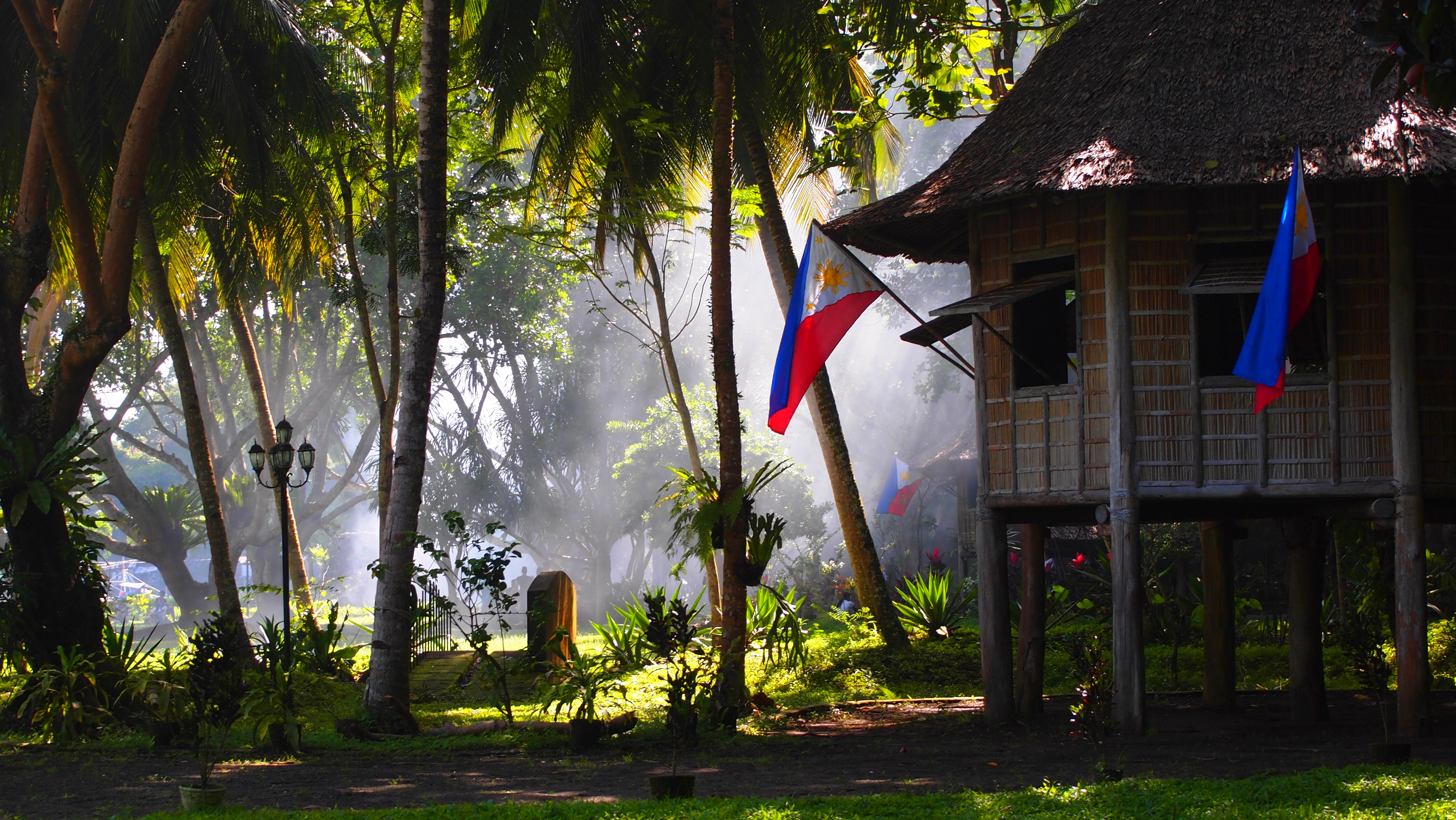
- The Rizal Shrine in Dapitan

- Location within Philippines
- Location: Zamboanga del Norte, Philippines
- Nearest city: Dapitan
- Coordinates: 8°40′2″N 123°25′0″E
- Area: 439 hectares (1,080 acres)
- Established: September 3, 1940 (National park); April 23, 2000 (Protected landscape)
- Governing body: National Historical Commission; Department of Environment and Natural Resources

The José Rizal Memorial Protected Landscape, also known as the Rizal Park and Shrine, is a protected landscape and memorial to the Philippines' national hero located in the city of Dapitan on the island of Mindanao. It preserves the farm site in barrio Talisay where José Rizal was exiled for four years from 1892-1896 after being accused of sedition and plotting the Philippine revolution in Manila by the Spanish colonial authorities. The protected area was established in 1940 as the Rizal National Park covering an initial area of 10 hectares (25 acres) through Proclamation No. 616 signed by President Manuel Luis Quezon. In 2000, it was enlarged to its present size of 439 hectares (1,080 acres) with a buffer zone of 15 hectares (37 acres) and was declared a protected landscape under the National Integrated Protected Areas System through Proclamation No. 279.

The José Rizal Memorial Protected Landscape occupies a hilly peninsula facing the Dapitan Bay in Zamboanga del Norte. It is located in the seaside barangay of Talisay, about a kilometer northwest from the Dapitan city proper.

== History ==
The 16-hectare (40-acre) estate in Talisay was purchased by Rizal for P4,000 after winning the Reales Loterías Españolas de Filipinas (English: Royal Spanish Lottery of the Philippines) two months after arriving in Dapitan. Rizal built houses in the site, started a farm, put up a school for boys, and built a hospital where he could practice medicine and treat the poor for free. For four years, he worked as a rural physician, farmer, merchant, inventor, painter, sculptor, archaeologist, linguist, teacher, architect, poet, biologist and environmentalist. His mother, Teodora Alonso, sisters and other relatives would later on come to live with him in the farm. In 1897, after Rizal was executed, these properties were confiscated by the Spanish colonial government as indemnity to the state and transferred to the custody of Don Cosme Borromeo. The site was then converted into a public park in 1913 with the structures built by Rizal reconstructed on their original sites.

== Rizal Shrine ==
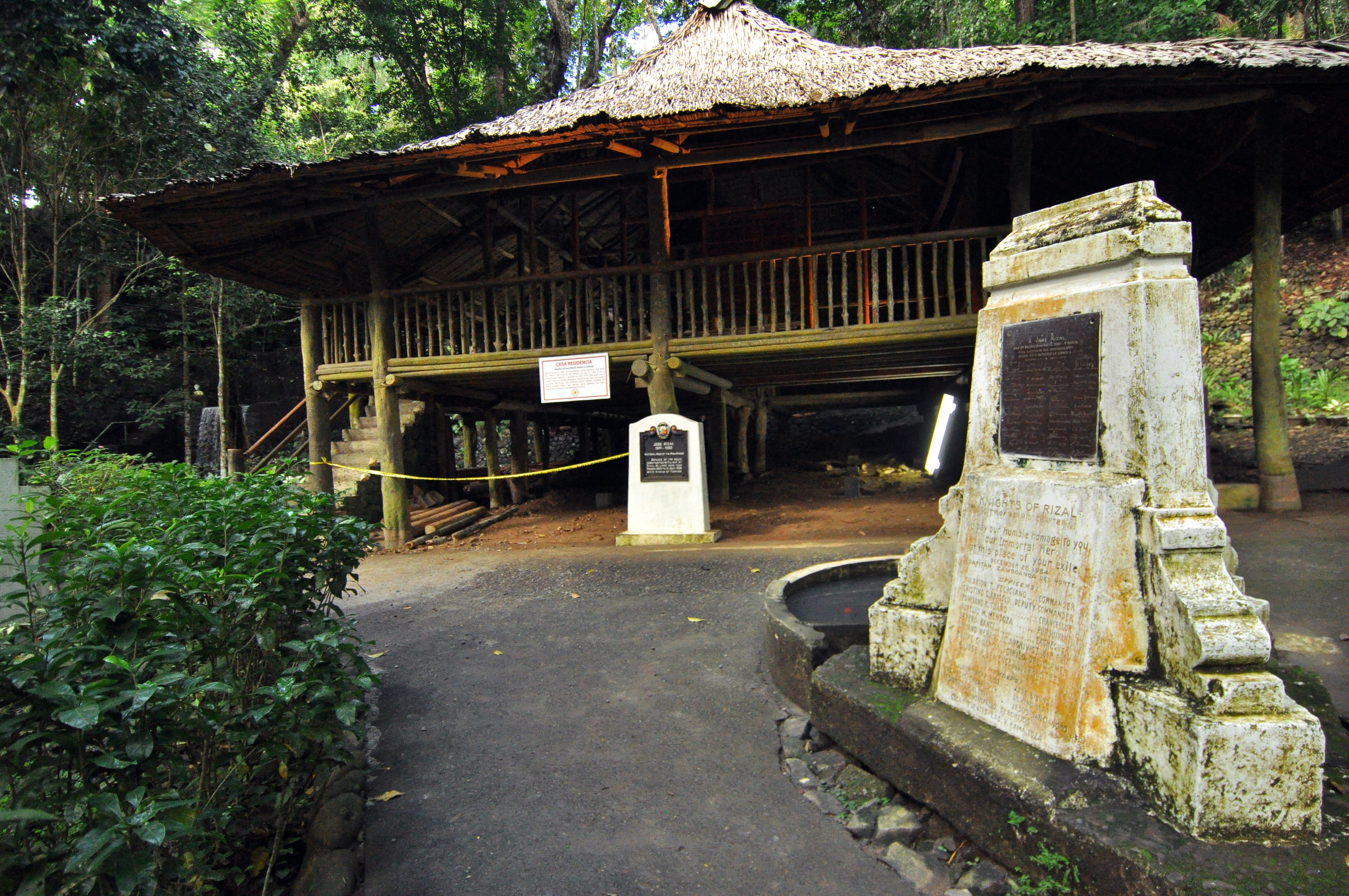
Casa Residencia

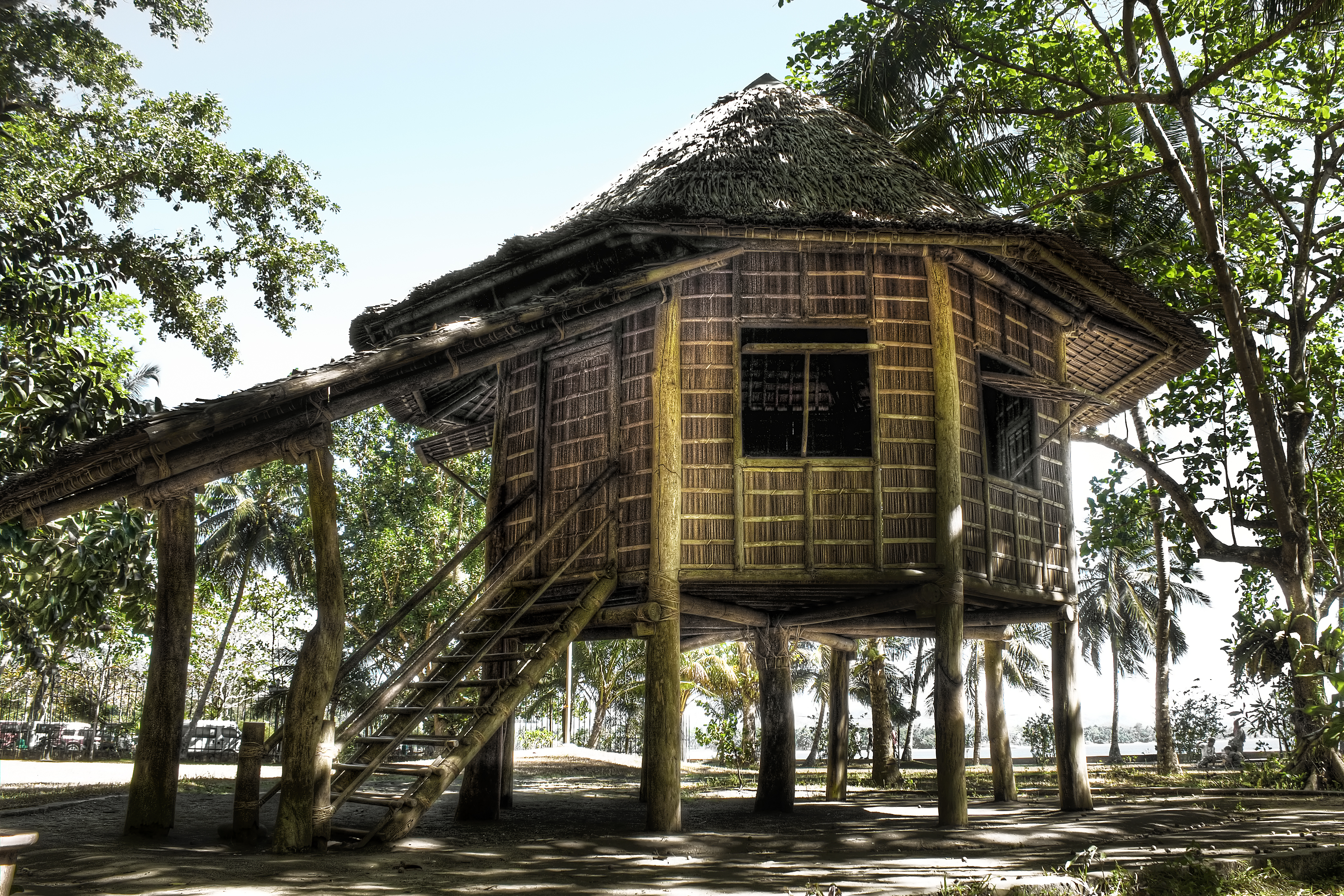
Casa Redonda

The protected landscape area contains the Rizal National Shrine, declared in 1973 through Presidential Decree No. 105. It is a collection of five reconstructed houses of bamboo and nipa originally built by José Rizal, as well as other auxiliary structures

Casa Residencia
The main house and also the biggest. It served as Rizal's residence where his mother and sisters also stayed during their visit. It has one bedroom and a surrounding veranda with views of the Dapitan Bay.

Casa Redonda
The Round House. An octagonal stilt house that served as the quarters of Rizal's students and a clinic.

Casa Cuadrada
The Square House. Located at the base of a hill, it served as a workshop and secondary dormitory for Rizal's students.

Casitas de Salud
The Health Houses. Two small huts perched atop a low hill, one for males and the other for females, which provided lodgings for Rizal's out-of-town patients.

Cocina
An outdoor kitchen with thatched roofing and open walls for ventilation, it features a traditional banggerahan (scullery) and kalan (firewood-fueled clay stove).

Casa Redonda Pequena
A hexagonal shed which was used as a henhouse.

Other structures found in the park include a dam constructed by Rizal, an aqueduct, a water reservoir, an amphitheater and a museum. The Rizaliana Museum built in 1971 contains the hero's memorabilia including the blackboard and table he used for teaching. It is located near the park's entrance which also houses the office of the shrine curator. A large rock in the middle of the park known as Mi Retiro Rock marks the spot where Rizal wrote his poems Mi Retiro (My Retreat) and Himno a Talisay (Hymn to Talisay) about his life in exile in Dapitan.

== Accessibility ==
The protected landscape and memorial is located some 9 kilometres (5.6 mi) north of the Dipolog Airport. It is accessible via the Dipolog–Oroquieta National Road and Jose Rizal Avenue in Dapitan which also leads to the Dakak Park and Beach Resort in Taguilon.

== See also ==
- Rizal Park
- Jose Rizal Farm
