= Selinog =

Municipality in Zamboanga del Norte, Philippines

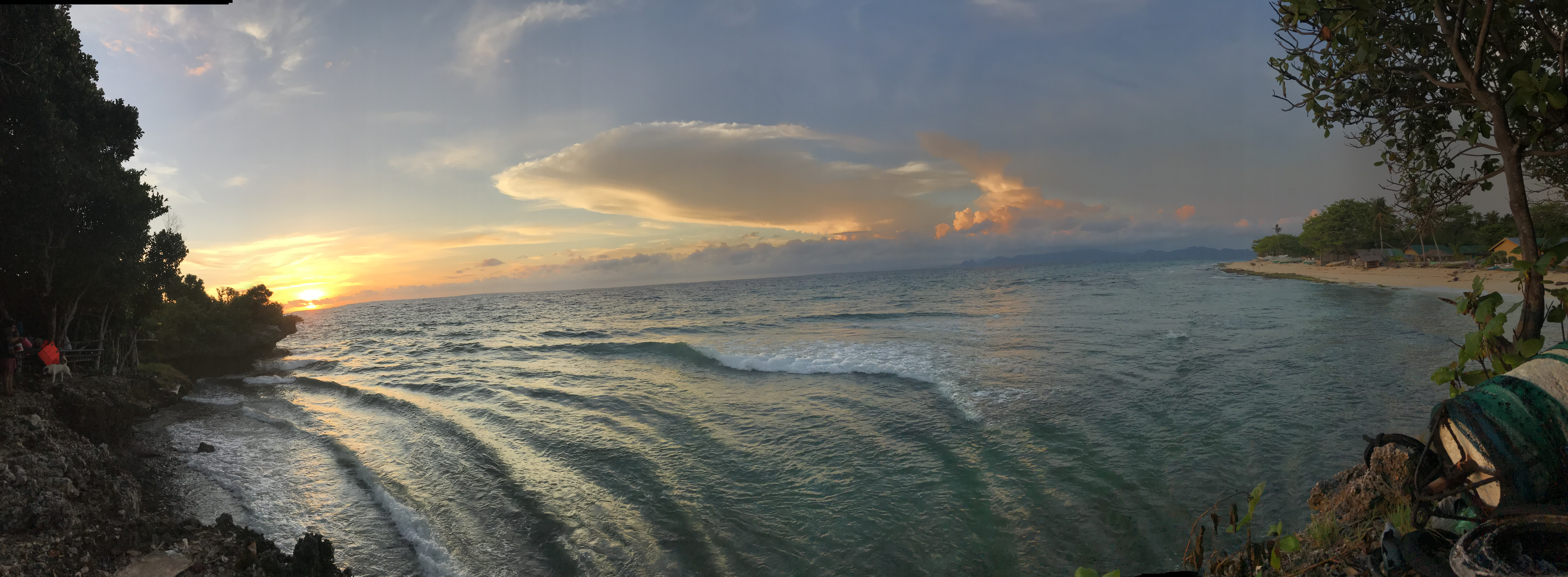

- Location within Philippines

Geography
- Location: 12.9 kilometers (8.0 mi) off mainland Dapitan
- Coordinates: 8°51′17″N 123°25′1″E
- Adjacent to: Bohol Sea

Administration
- Philippines
- Region: Zamboanga Peninsula
- Province: Zamboanga del Norte
- City: Dapitan

Additional information

Selinog, historically known as Silino (Cebuano: Silinog) and also named Silinog, is an island barangay in Dapitan, Zamboanga del Norte, Philippines. It is coterminous with Silino Island and is located 12.9 kilometres (8.0 mi) off Tagolo Point, the northern entrance point to Dapitan Bay, and some 15 kilometres (9.3 mi) east of the island of Aliguay in the Bohol Sea. The island is a flat coralline island with a land area of 78 hectares (190 acres). It is surrounded by 70 hectares (170 acres) of coral reefs and sandy areas. According to the 2020 census, the island community has a population of 692 inhabitants.

Majority of the island's inhabitants depend on fishing for subsistence and livelihood. Recently, salt-making, basket-weaving and marine tourism were also introduced as alternative sustainable livelihoods. As a barangay, the island has a health clinic, elementary school and barangay hall.

With its white sand beaches and rich aquatic resources, Silinog was declared a marine reserve by the local government of Dapitan. In April 2000, the Philippine government through Proclamation No. 276 established the 1,294-hectare (3,200-acre) Selinog Island Protected Landscape and Seascape covering the whole island and surrounding reefs to better manage its resources.

== Demographics ==
Population census of Selinog
Year	Pop.	±% p.a.
2010	712	—
2015	697	−0.40%
2020	692	−0.15%
Source: Philippine Statistics Authority

== See also ==
- List of islands of the Philippines
