= Taluksangay Mosque =

Mosque in Zamboanga, Philippines

- Masjid sin Taluksangay مَسْجِدْ سِنْ تَلُكْسَڠَيْ
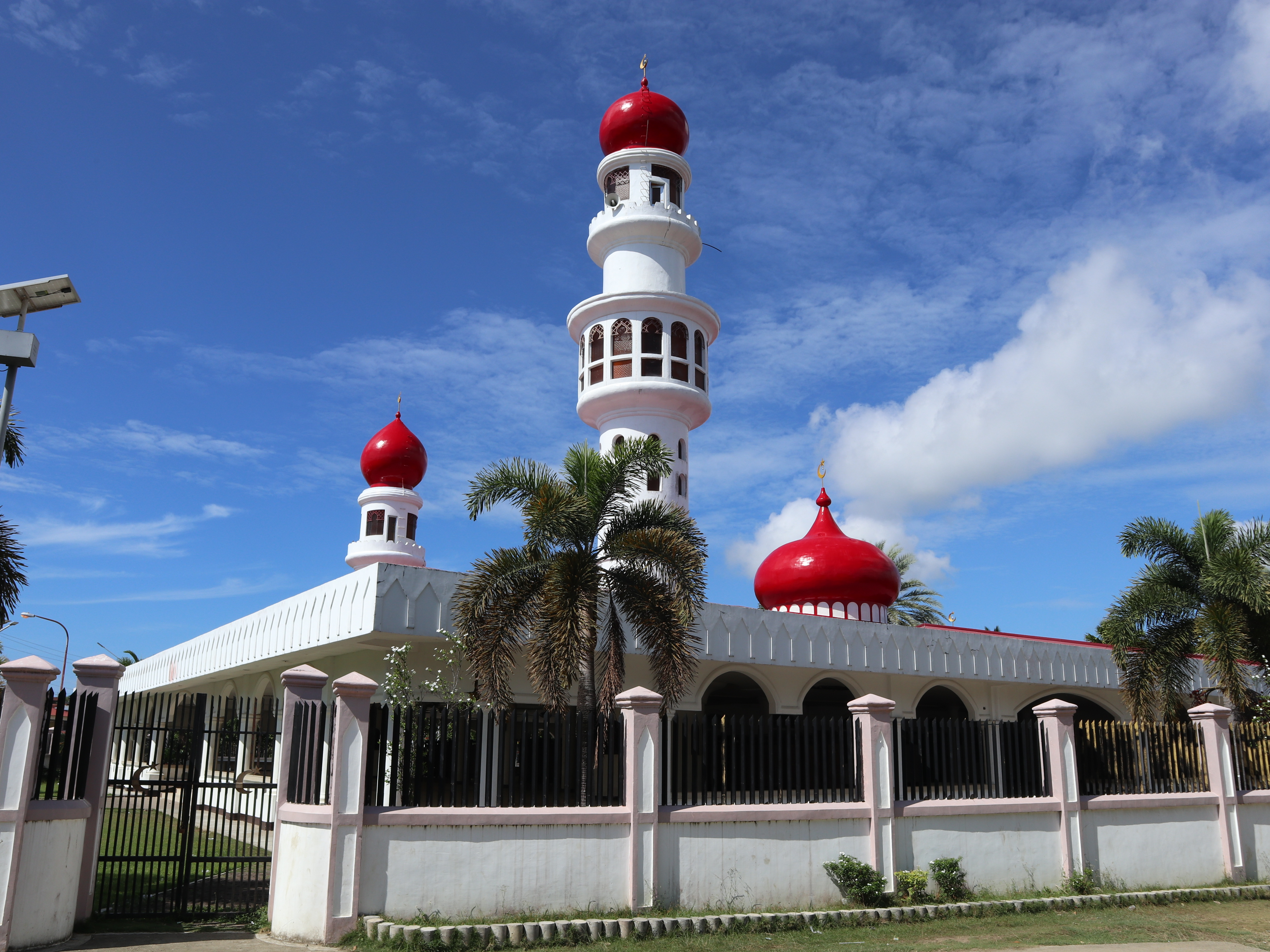

- Location in Mindanao Location in the Philippines

Religion
- Affiliation: Sunni Islam

Location
- Location: Zamboanga City, Philippines
- Interactive map of Taluksangay Mosque
- Coordinates: 6°57′2″N 122°10′53″E

Architecture
- Type: Mosque
- Completed: 1885
- Minaret: 2

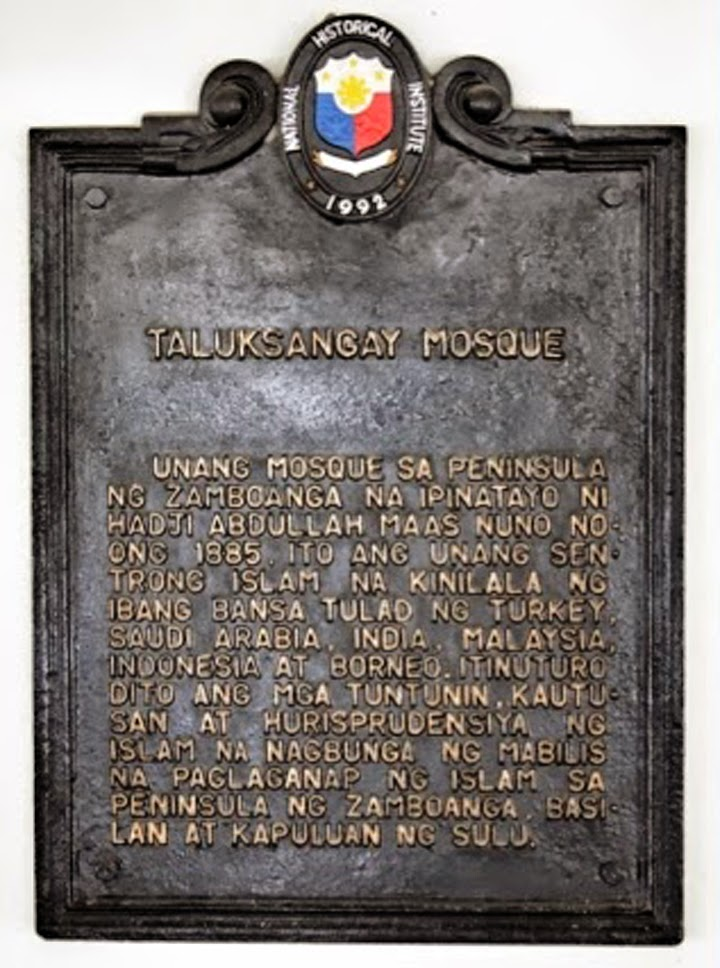
NHCP historical marker for Taluksangay Mosque

The Taluksangay Mosque (Tausug: Masjid sin Taluksangay) was built by Hadji Abdullah Maas Nuno in 1885 in the Barangay Taluksangay, Zamboanga City, the Philippines. It is the oldest mosque in Zamboanga Peninsula.

Taluksangay was the first center of Islamic propagation in the Zamboanga Peninsula. Muslim religious missionaries from Arabia, India, Malaysia, Indonesia and Borneo have been flocking to this village. A representative of the Sultan of Turkey (Sheik-Al Islam) visited this place in later part of 1914. At the height of the MNLF (Moro National Liberation Front) military conflict in 1973, members of the Quadripartite Committee, Generals Fidel V. Ramos and Romeo Espino, visited Taluksangay village. Even at the height of trouble during the 1970s, tourists continued to arrive in this historical village.

The majority of the inhabitants of Taluksangay are Muslims the descendants of the Sama Banguingui who were branded by history as pirates of Southeast Asia, but never conquered.

== See also ==
- Islam in the Philippines
