= Dapitan =

Component city in Zamboanga del Norte, Philippines

- Component city
- City of Dapitan
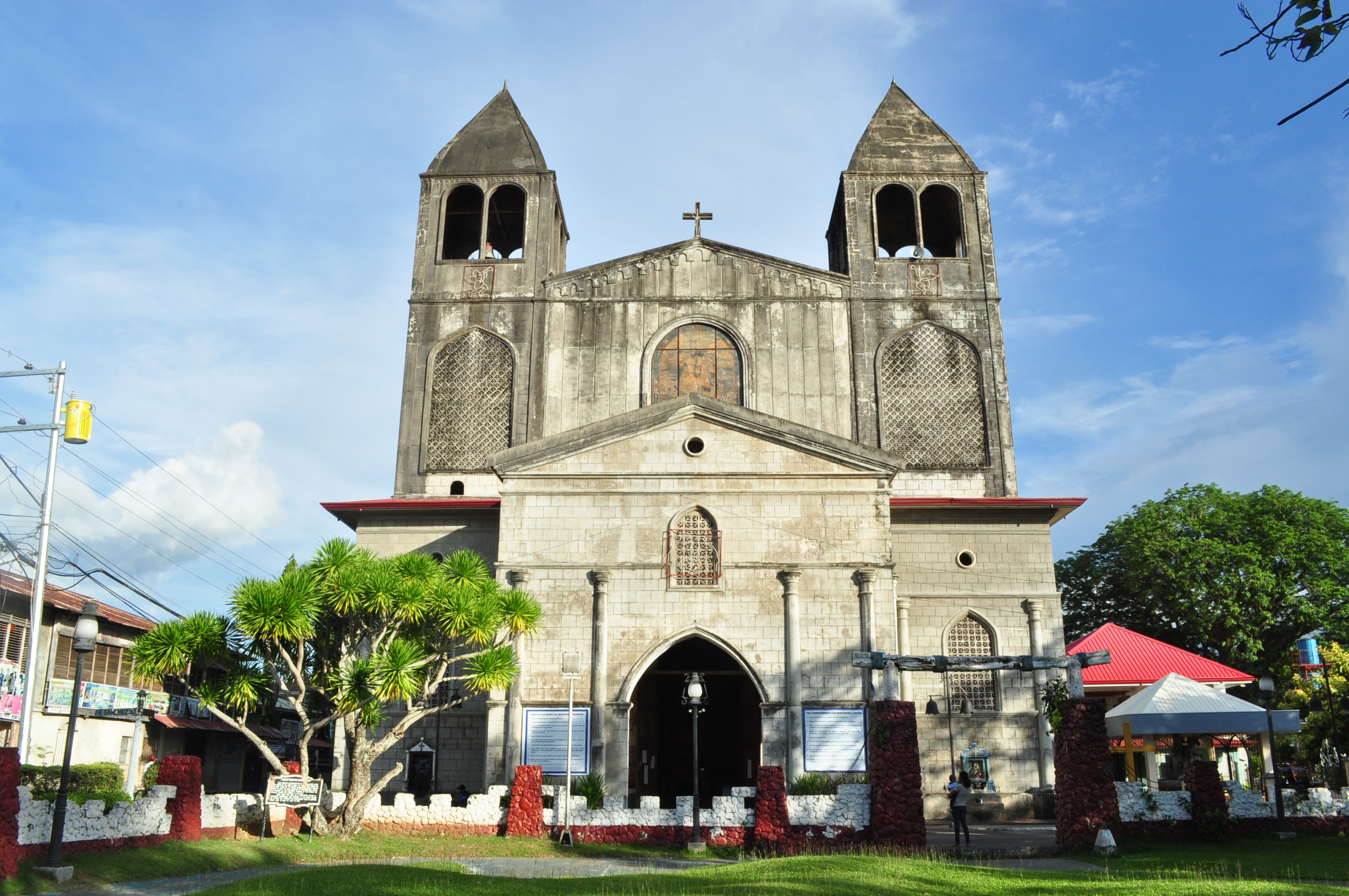
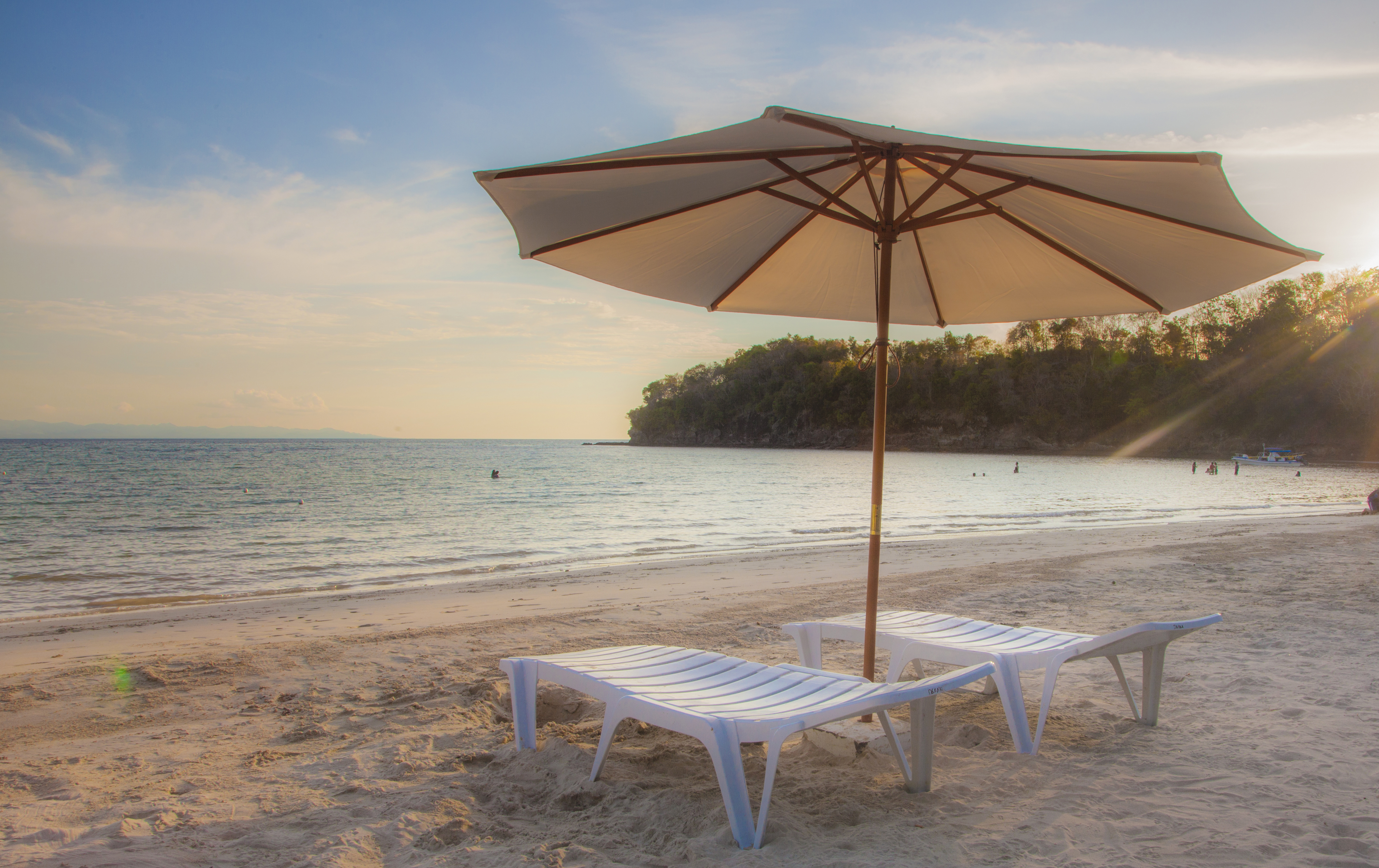
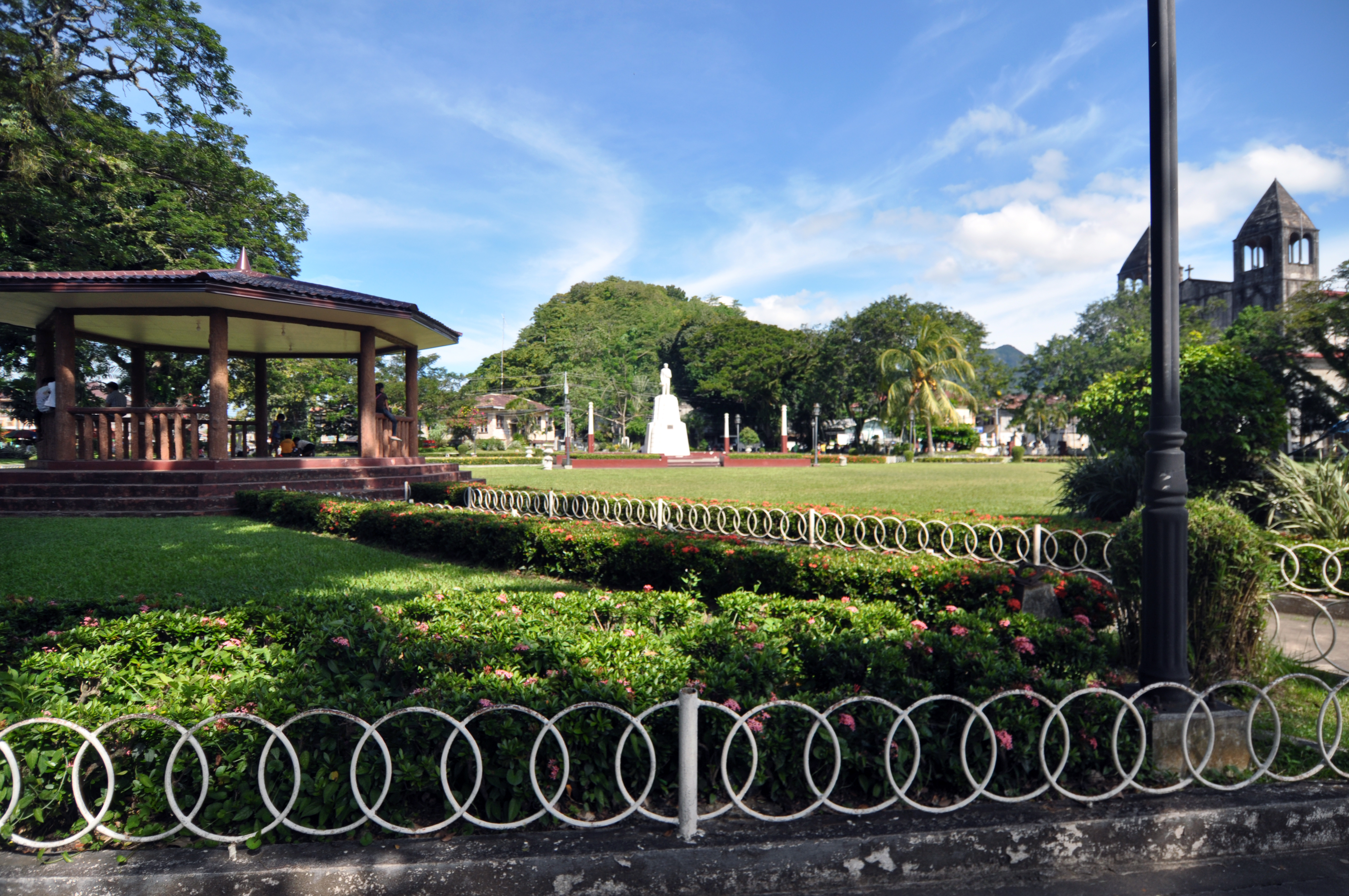
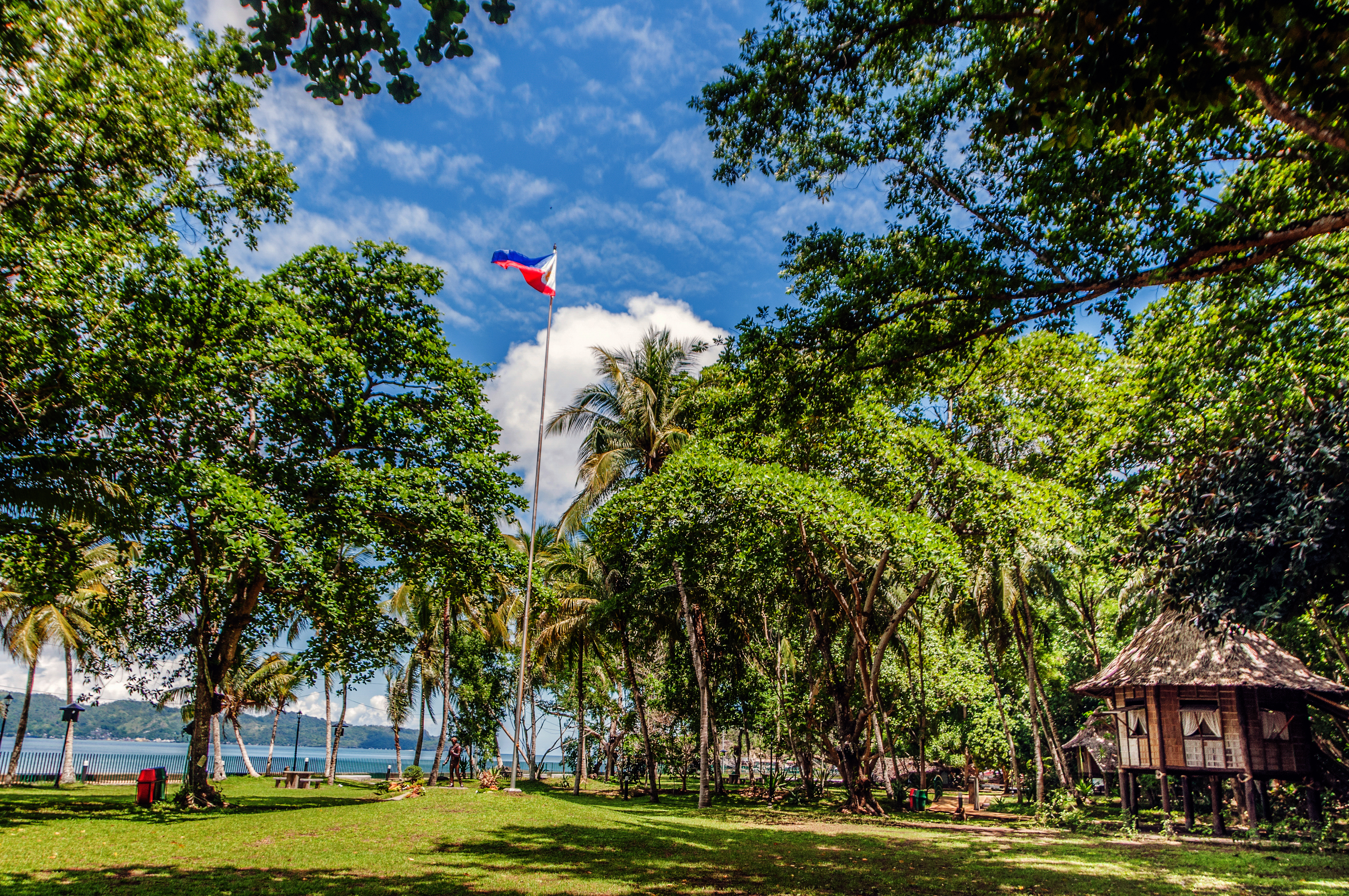
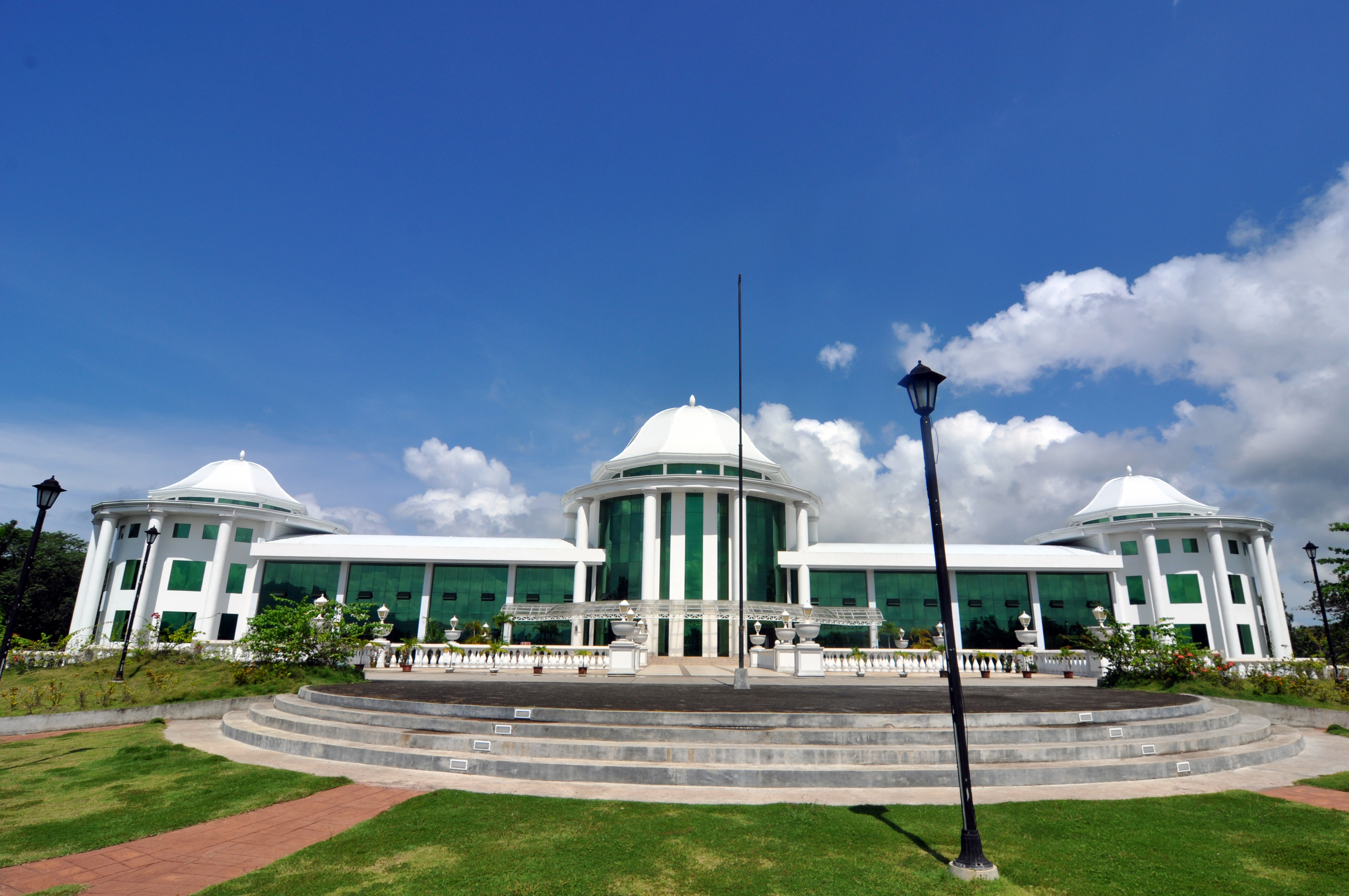
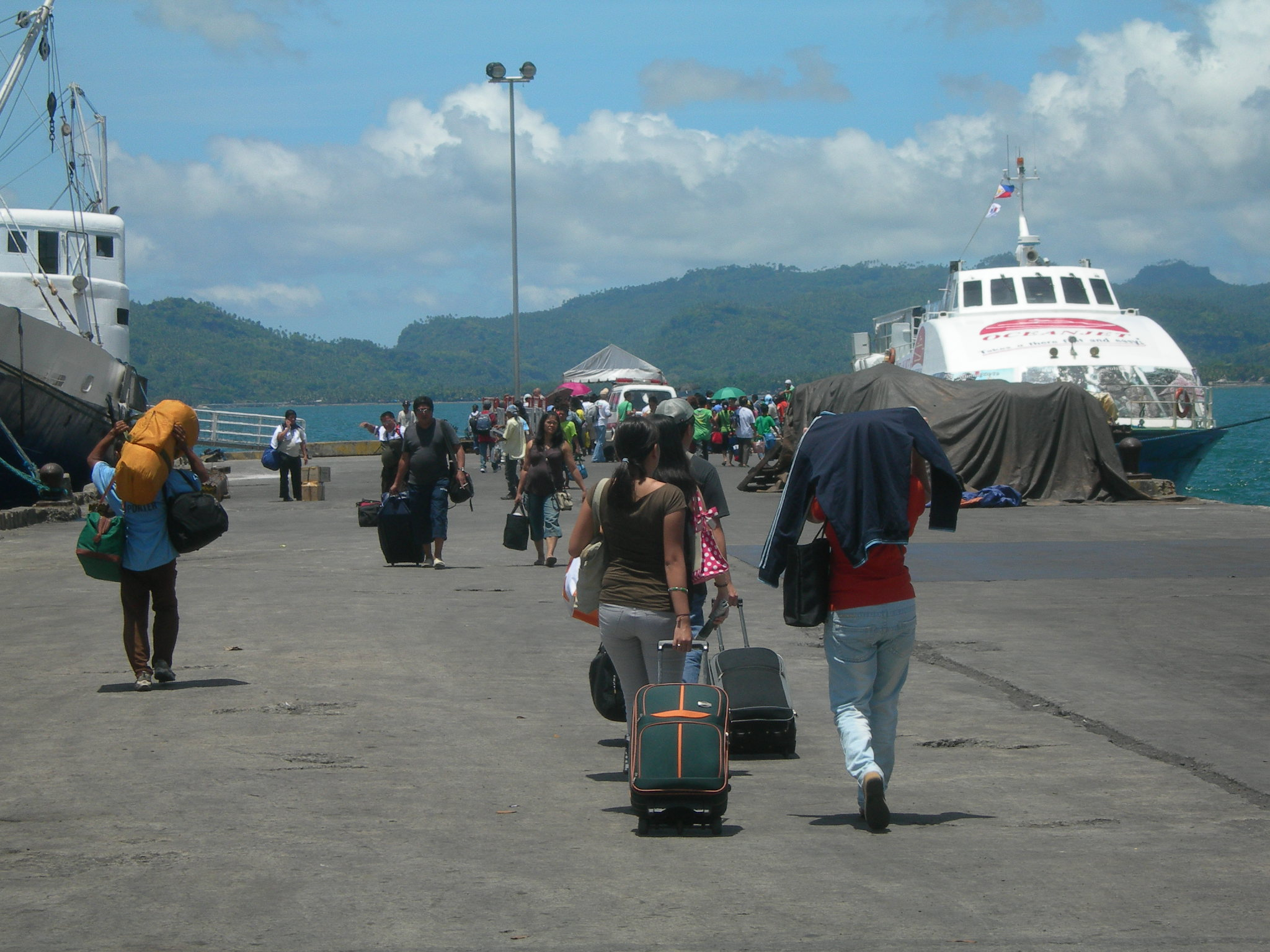
- Saint James the Greater Church Dakak Park and Beach Resort Liwasan ng Dapitan José Rizal Memorial Protected Landscape City Hall of Dapitan Port of Dapitan

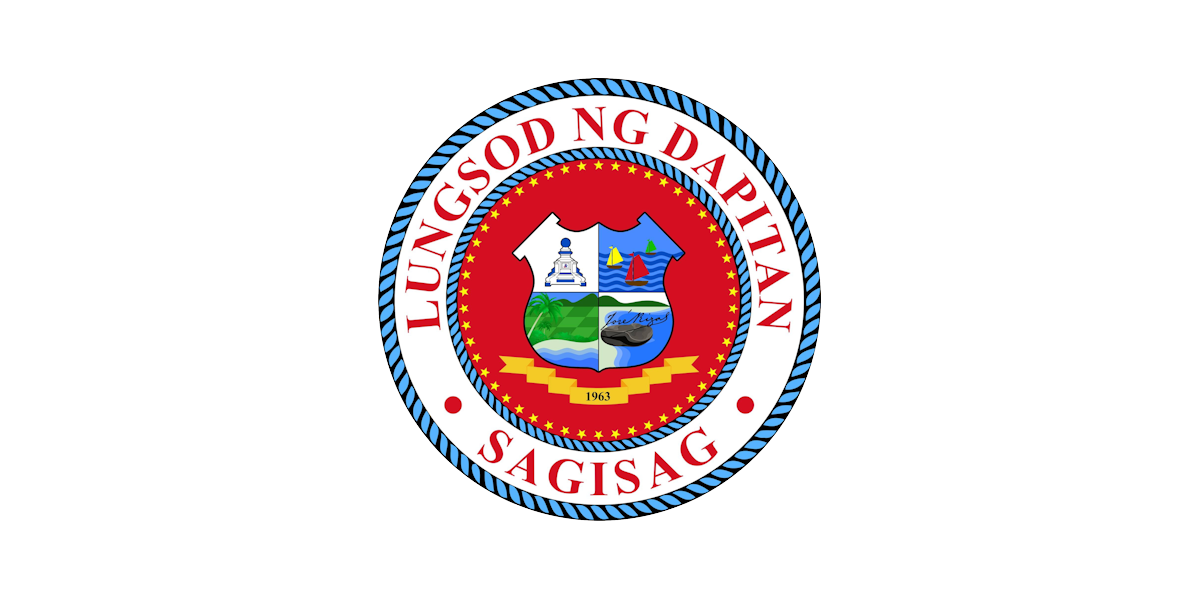
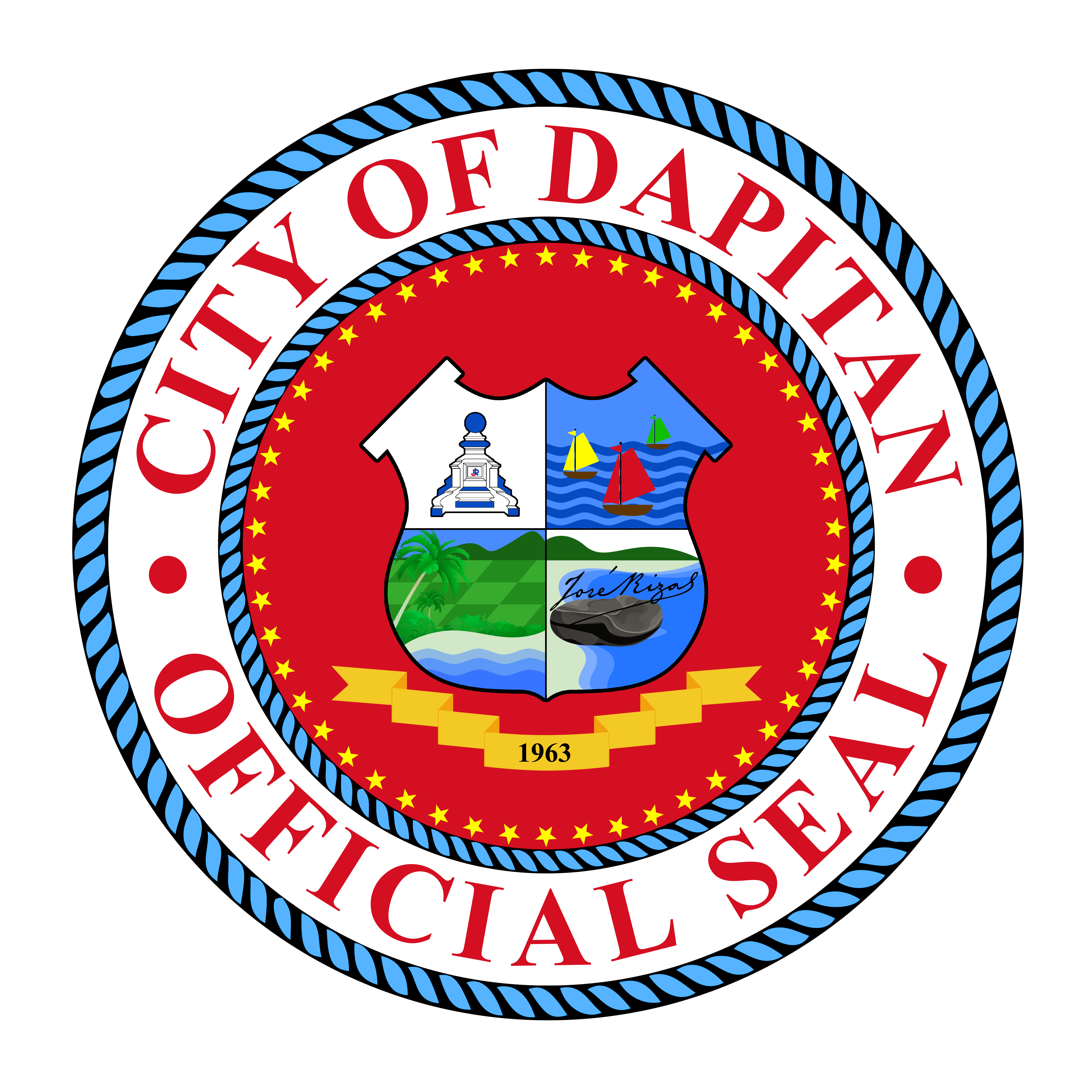
- Flag Seal
- Nicknames: Shrine City of the Philippines; Historic City of the South; Rizal City of the South; Kidatuan of Bool
- Anthem: Dapitan, Bahandi nga Gasa
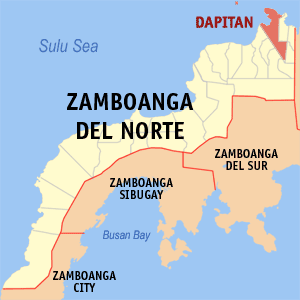
- Map of Zamboanga del Norte with Dapitan highlighted
- Interactive map of Dapitan
- Location within the Philippines
- Coordinates: 8°39′18″N 123°25′27″E
- Country: Philippines
- Region: Zamboanga Peninsula
- Province: Zamboanga del Norte
- District: 1st district
- Founded: 1629
- Cityhood: June 22, 1963
- Barangays: 50 (see Barangays)

Government
  - Type: Sangguniang Panlungsod
  - Mayor: Evelyn T. Uy (Lakas)
  - Vice Mayor: Gabriel M. Cad (Lakas)
  - Representative: Roberto T. Uy Jr. (Lakas)
  - City Council: Members: Raul B. Carreon; Alexandra Judith P. Meily; Ian Francis J. Adasa; Jeneth C. Napigquit-Baje; John D. Empeynado; Bienvenido T. Dini-ay; Dennis A. Tan; Jonathan C. Cadiente; Erasmo J. Bayron; Ruel S. Nadela; Hamilcar Tacbaya (ABC); Lyza G. Salazar (SK); Rey C. Aguilar, Jr. (IPMR)
  - Electorate: 75,602 voters (2025)

Area
  - Total: 390.53 km^{2} (150.78 sq mi)
- Elevation: 33 m (108 ft)
- Highest elevation: 590 m (1,940 ft)
- Lowest elevation: 0 m (0 ft)

Population (2024 census)
  - Total: 87,699
  - Density: 224.56/km^{2} (581.62/sq mi)
  - Households: 19,828
- Demonym: Dapitanon

Economy
  - Income class: 2nd city income class
  - Poverty incidence: 38.95% (2023)
  - Revenue: ₱ 1,230 million (2024)
  - Assets: ₱ 4,958 million (2024)
  - Expenditure: ₱ 664.9 million (2024)
  - Liabilities: ₱ 1,664 million (2024)

Service provider
  - Electricity: Zamboanga del Norte Electric Cooperative (ZANECO)
  - Water: Dapitan City Water District (DapCWD)
- Time zone: UTC+8 (PST)
- ZIP code: 7101
- PSGC: 0907201000
- IDD : area code: +63 (0)65
- Native languages: Subanon; Cebuano; Chavacano; Tagalog
- Catholic diocese: Diocese of Dipolog
- Patron saint: Saint James the Great and Our Lady of the Pllar
- Website: dapitancity.gov.ph

Dapitan, officially the City of Dapitan (Cebuano: Dakbayan sa Dapitan; Subanon: Gembagel G'benwa Dapitan/Bagbenwa Dapitan; Filipino: Lungsod ng Dapitan), is a component city in the province of Zamboanga del Norte, Philippines. According to the 2024 census, it has a population of 87,699 people.

It is historically significant as the place where José Rizal was exiled by the Spanish colonial authorities for his threat to start revolutionary activities. He is considered a national hero, and this is known as the "Shrine City in the Philippines." The city is also home to Gloria's Fantasyland, the first amusement park in Mindanao.

== History ==
=== Precolonial era ===
The earliest settlers of Dapitan were the Subanens, a nomadic tribe of Austronesian stock known to have settled and lived along the banks of the river or “suba” out of which their present-day tribal identity originated.

In 1564, the people of the Dapitan Kingdom, headed by Pagbuaya, initially based on Bohol, migrated to what is now Dapitan after their territory was subjugated. The polity existed until 1595, when Dapitan was brutally subjugated by the Spanish colonizers.

=== Spanish colonial era ===
Early cartographers of the Philippines showed Dapitan's location on their maps of Mindanao in varying names, such as "Dapito" in Kaerius' map of 1598, "Dapite" in Dudley's map of 1646, "Dapyto" in Sanson's map of 1652, and "Dapitan" in Moll's map of East Indies 1729 and in Murillo Velarde's map of 1734.

Dapitan was already a thriving settlement when Miguel López de Legazpi's expedition arrived in 1565. It is believed that the Augustinian friars that accompanied Legazpi's expedition converted the natives to Christianity. Foremost of the converts were Pedro Manooc, son of Pagbuaya, and Manooc's daughter, Maria Uray. A permanent mission was founded at Dapitan in 1629 headed by a Jesuit missionary, Father Pedro Gutierrez.

The Augustinian friar Andrés de Urdaneta of the Legazpi expedition records the name of the settlement as "Daquepitan", and later "Dacpitan."

It was only after the establishment of the Jesuit mission that a strong and stable form of government was finally established. The Spanish authorities adopted the local form of government that was already existing but placed the officials under the absolute control of the Spanish government. The settlement came to be known as the "pueblo", and its head variously called either "Datu", "Capitan" or "Cabeza de Barangay".

The 1818 census recorded that Dapitan had 686 native families and 2 Spanish-Filipino families.

The politico-military commandancia of Dapitan until the end of the Spanish domination in 1898 was still dependent on Misamis. It was only during the revolutionary period that Dapitan became an integral part of the Filipino forces in Zamboanga.

=== Cityhood ===
On June 22, 1963, President Diosdado Macapagal signed R.A. 3811 which converted Dapitan into a chartered city. On November 8, 1963, president Macapagal signed Proclamation No. 179 which also converted Dapitan into a city, with him appointing Germanico Carreon and Francisco Hamoy as the city's mayor and vice mayor respectively on November 12. It is officially renowned as the "Shrine City of the Philippines."

== Geography ==
Dapitan is situated at the mouth of the Dapitan River on Dapitan Bay, and is the northernmost point of the Zamboanga Peninsula. It is about 404 nautical miles (748 km; 465 mi) south of Metro Manila; 156 nautical miles (289 km; 180 mi) to Zamboanga City; and 14 kilometres (8.7 mi) to Dipolog.

=== Climate ===
Climate data for Dapitan, Zamboanga del Norte
| Month | Jan | Feb | Mar | Apr | May | Jun | Jul | Aug | Sep | Oct | Nov | Dec | Year |
|---|---|---|---|---|---|---|---|---|---|---|---|---|---|
| Mean daily maximum °C (°F) | 29 (84) | 29 (84) | 30 (86) | 31 (88) | 30 (86) | 30 (86) | 29 (84) | 30 (86) | 30 (86) | 29 (84) | 29 (84) | 29 (84) | 30 (85) |
| Mean daily minimum °C (°F) | 23 (73) | 23 (73) | 23 (73) | 24 (75) | 25 (77) | 25 (77) | 24 (75) | 24 (75) | 24 (75) | 24 (75) | 24 (75) | 24 (75) | 24 (75) |
| Average precipitation mm (inches) | 104 (4.1) | 76 (3.0) | 92 (3.6) | 97 (3.8) | 199 (7.8) | 238 (9.4) | 195 (7.7) | 193 (7.6) | 178 (7.0) | 212 (8.3) | 171 (6.7) | 110 (4.3) | 1,865 (73.3) |
| Average rainy days | 14.7 | 12.5 | 15.8 | 17.5 | 27.6 | 28.5 | 29.0 | 27.5 | 26.9 | 27.9 | 23.5 | 18.2 | 269.6 |
Source: Meteoblue (modeled/calculated data, not measured locally)

=== Barangays ===
Dapitan is politically subdivided into 50 barangays. Each barangay consists of puroks while some have sitios.

Currently, there are 8 barangays which considered urban, 27 are interior, 13 are coastal, and 2 are island barangays. In 1955, the sitios of Sipalok, Barcelona, and Potungan were converted into barrios.

Barangays of Dapitan
| Administration | | | Population | | | |
| Barangay | Class | Barangay Captain | PSGC | 2024 | 2020 | 4 year change |
|---|---|---|---|---|---|---|
| Aliguay | Rural (Island) | Dennis E. Llena | 097201001 | 601 | 720 | −16.53% |
| Antipolo | Rural (Interior) | Samuel J. Elcamel | 097201002 | 1,575 | 1,457 | +8.10% |
| Aseniero | Rural (Interior) | Ronilo B. Dawat | 097201003 | 2,142 | 2,098 | +2.10% |
| Ba-ao | Rural (Interior) | Lucila B. Bagalanon | 097201004 | 916 | 955 | −4.08% |
| Bagting | Urban (Poblacion) | Helen Grace D. Sy | 097201048 | 800 | 1,019 | −21.49% |
| Banbanan | Rural (Coastal) | Jenet T. Enguito | 097201005 | 1,393 | 1,302 | +6.99% |
| Banonong | Urban (Poblacion) | Hamilcar F. Tacbaya | 097201049 | 4,148 | 4,164 | −0.38% |
| Barcelona | Rural (Interior) | Gregorio A. Jarapan Jr. | 097201006 | 2,427 | 2,226 | +9.03% |
| Baylimango | Rural (Coastal) | Grezelda I. Pacaro | 097201007 | 1,656 | 1,440 | +15.00% |
| Burgos | Rural (Interior) | Cyrus S. Tigon | 097201009 | 1,365 | 1,390 | −1.80% |
| Canlucani | Rural (Coastal) | Edna C. Abad | 097201010 | 1,169 | 1,344 | −13.02% |
| Carang | Rural (Coastal) | Merba L. Yabo | 097201011 | 849 | 790 | +7.47% |
| Cawa-cawa | Urban (Poblacion) | Delfin A. Malingin | 097201050 | 2,628 | 2,634 | −0.23% |
| Dampalan | Rural (Interior) | Alexander D. Villa | 097201012 | 1,442 | 1,616 | −10.77% |
| Daro | Rural (Interior) | Diosdada T. Sangual | 097201013 | 680 | 673 | +1.04% |
| Dawo | Urban (Poblacion) | Sushmita R. Jalosjos | 097201051 | 2,499 | 2,522 | −0.91% |
| Diwa-an | Rural (Interior) | Constancia A. Belotindos | 097201014 | 1,106 | 1,149 | −3.74% |
| Guimputlan | Rural (Coastal) | Carmelito E. Bulay-og | 097201016 | 838 | 817 | +2.57% |
| Hilltop | Rural (Interior) | Edgardo E. Bulagao | 097201017 | 758 | 904 | −16.15% |
| Ilaya | Rural (Interior) | Predemar D. Quizo | 097201018 | 2,887 | 2,873 | +0.49% |
| Kauswagan | Rural (Interior) | Hazel E. Sapalleda | 097201046 | 1,872 | 1,511 | +23.89% |
| Larayan | Rural (Interior) | Nerio B. Seripa | 097201019 | 2,520 | 2,502 | +0.72% |
| Linabo | Urban (Poblacion) | Crispino S. Saldon III | 097201053 | 1,522 | 1,530 | −0.52% |
| Liyang | Rural (Interior) | Nilo C. Pegarido | 097201020 | 1,130 | 877 | +28.85% |
| Maria Cristina | Rural (Interior) | Hermoso C. Sagapsapan | 097201021 | 2,469 | 2,396 | +3.05% |
| Maria Uray | Rural (Interior) | Luz B. Caga-anan | 097201022 | 1,522 | 1,632 | −6.74% |
| Masidlakon | Interior | Exelliador B. Jumalon | 097201023 | 1,350 | 1,423 | −5.13% |
| Napo | Rural (Coastal) | Lilia S. Adasa | 097201024 | 1,404 | 1,042 | +34.74% |
| Opao | Rural (Interior) | Mary Angeli N. Lasquite | 097201025 | 1,522 | 1,527 | −0.33% |
| Oro | Rural (Coastal) | Grace C. Tagapan | 097201026 | 1,202 | 1,119 | +7.42% |
| Owaon | Rural (Interior) | Meneciano S. Dajuela | 097201027 | 2,270 | 2,264 | +0.27% |
| Oyan | Interior | Rene G. Senio | 097201028 | 856 | 790 | +8.35% |
| Polo | Urban (Coastal) | Oscar S. Balladares | 097201031 | 3,345 | 2,795 | +19.68% |
| Potol | Urban (Poblacion) | Clifford D. Hamoy | 097201054 | 1,207 | 1,648 | −26.76% |
| Potungan | Rural (Interior) | Nilbert B. Dalman | 097201032 | 1,560 | 1,652 | −5.57% |
| San Francisco | Rural (Interior) | Elma D. Maglinte | 097201033 | 624 | 590 | +5.76% |
| San Nicolas | Rural (Interior) | Hanibal A. Magsayo | 097201034 | 1,490 | 1,561 | −4.55% |
| San Pedro | Rural (Coastal) | Erlan D. Darunday | 097201035 | 2,374 | 2,220 | +6.94% |
| San Vicente | Rural (Coastal) | Arnel R. Lacquio | 097201036 | 2,626 | 2,640 | −0.53% |
| Santa Cruz | Urban (Poblacion) | Miguel B. Gahisan Jr. | 097201055 | 1,399 | 1,462 | −4.31% |
| Santo Niño | Rural (Coastal) | Crisologo R. Jumuad | 097201042 | 1,928 | 2,007 | −3.94% |
| Selinog | Rural (Island) | Felix B. Tuballa | 097201040 | 690 | 692 | −0.29% |
| Sicayab-Bucana | Rural (Coastal) | Joie S. Sardane | 097201038 | 3,419 | 2,796 | +22.28% |
| Sigayan | Rural (Interior) | Liza S. Lear | 097201039 | 903 | 1,034 | −12.67% |
| Sinonoc | Rural (Interior) | Marivie O. Petalcorin | 097201041 | 1,724 | 1,519 | +13.50% |
| Sulangon | Rural (Interior) | Ramil A. Balladares | 097201043 | 3,777 | 3,569 | +5.83% |
| Taguilon | Rural (Coastal) | Elmer B. Yongco | 097201045 | 3,969 | 3,384 | +17.29% |
| Tag-ulo | Rural (Coastal) | Sheila B. Sumalpong | 097201044 | 863 | 722 | +19.53% |
| Talisay (Matagobtob Poblacion) (Note: The official website of the City of Dapitan refers to this barangay as "Talisay", while the Philippine Statistics Authority refers to this barangay as "Matagobtob Poblacion.") | Urban (Poblacion) | Marilyn O. Frankera | 097201052 | 3,365 | 3,245 | +3.70% |
| Tamion | Rural (Interior) | Helen R. Dagpin | 097201047 | 918 | 960 | −4.37% |
| City of Dapitan | | | 097201000 | 87,699 | 85,202 | +2.93% |
Source: Philippine Statistics Authority – Philippine Standard Geographic Code – City of Dapitan – Barangays

==== Taguilon ====
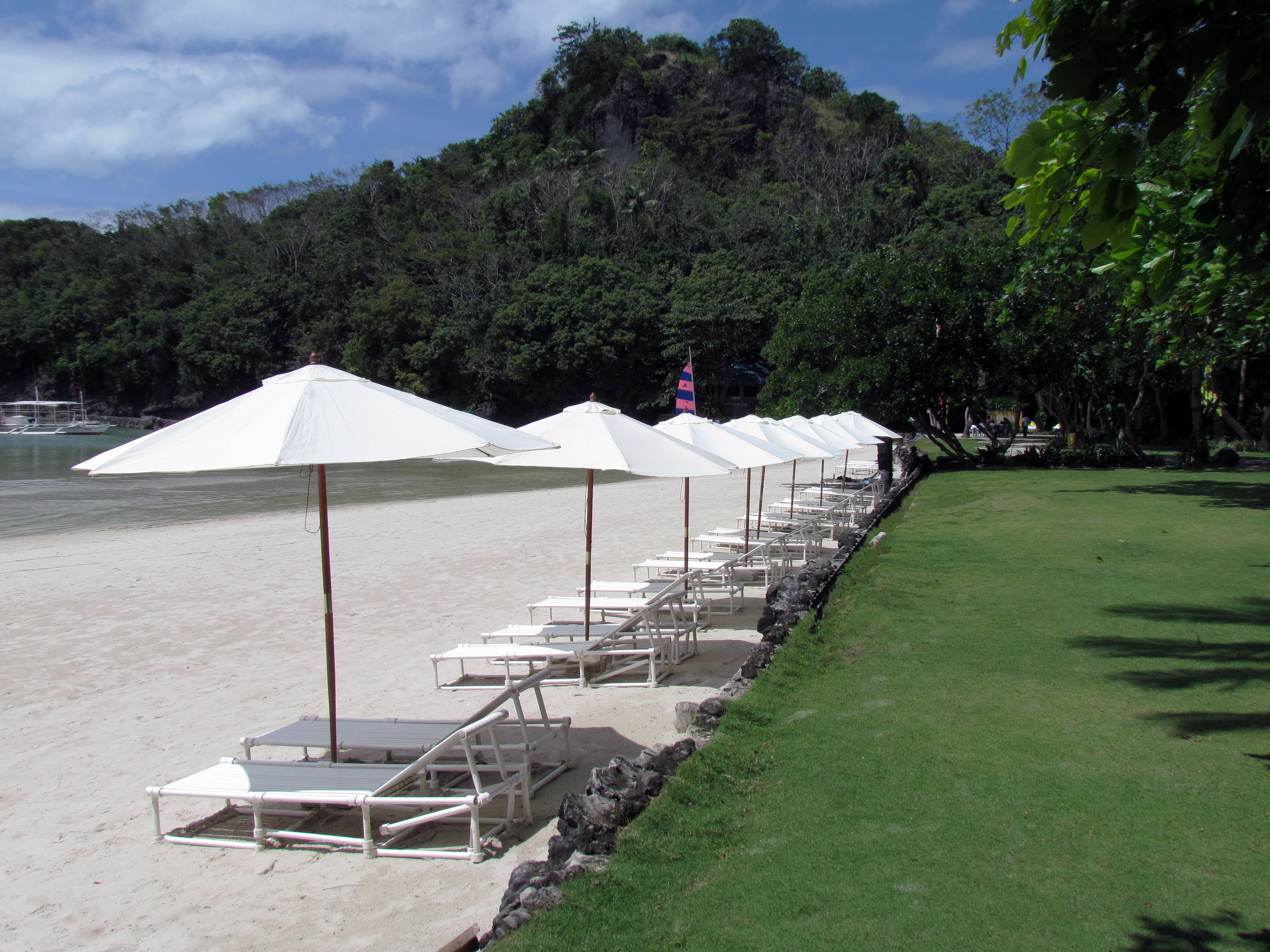
Dakak Beach Resort

Taguilon is home to the Dakak Park and Beach Resort. It is a producer of coconut and agar (based on sea weed) as well as a fishing port. The pier in Taguilon is a secondary/alternate port to the main passenger/cargo port in Dapitan. Additionally, during severe storms at sea, ferries and other ships find shelter in the Taguilon cove. One can find the mount Lalab overlooking the islets of Silinog and part of Balyangaw.

==== Talisay ====
Talisay is a seaside barangay where José Rizal spent four years in exile. A park and shrine honoring the Philippine national hero can be found in the José Rizal Memorial Protected Landscape, a protected area declared in 2000, located in the old Rizal farm site in the barangay.

== Demographics ==
Population census of Dapitan

| Year | Pop. | ±% p.a. |
|---|---|---|
| 1903 | 8,086 | — |
| 1918 | 12,866 | +3.14% |
| 1939 | 28,295 | +3.82% |
| 1948 | 37,984 | +3.33% |
| 1960 | 27,517 | −2.65% |
| 1970 | 37,781 | +3.22% |
| 1975 | 46,261 | +4.14% |
| 1980 | 54,694 | +3.40% |

| Year | Pop. | ±% p.a. |
|---|---|---|
| 1990 | 59,372 | +0.82% |
| 1995 | 62,997 | +1.12% |
| 2000 | 68,178 | +1.71% |
| 2007 | 72,792 | +0.91% |
| 2010 | 77,441 | +2.28% |
| 2015 | 82,418 | +1.19% |
| 2020 | 85,202 | +0.70% |
| 2024 | 87,699 | +0.70% |

Source: Philippine Statistics Authority

== Economy ==
Poverty incidence of Dapitan (%)

Source: Philippine Statistics Authority

== Government ==
Mayors of the
City of Dapitan
Rodolfo A. Carreon Sr., January 1960 to November 1963
Germanico A. Carreon, November 12, 1963 to April 30, 1986
Buensorceso Carpio, December 1, 1987 to February 2, 1988
James A. Adasa, 1988 to 1998
Joseph Cedrick O. Ruiz, 1998 to 2001
Rodolfo H. Carreon Jr., 2001 to 2004
Dominador G. Jalosjos Jr., 2004 to 2010, December 2010 to May 2012
Patri B. Chan, June to November 2010; May 2012 to January 27, 2013
Agapito J. Cardino, January 28, 2013, to June 30, 2013
Rosalina G. Jalosjos, July 1, 2013 to June 30, 2022
Seth Frederick P. Jalosjos, June 30, 2022 to June 30, 2025
Evelyn T. Uy, June 30, 2025 to present

Old seal of the city, NHCP version

Dapitan's seat of government, the City Hall, is located at the Dapitan Government Center in Barangay Dawo. The local government structure is composed of one mayor, one vice mayor and ten councilors all elected through popular vote. Two ex officio members are added to the City Council with one representing Dapitan's 50 Barangay Captains being the Association of Barangay Councils (ABC) President, and one representing Dapitan's 50 Barangay Youth Council Presidents being the Sangguniang Kabataan (SK) Federation President. Each official, with the exemption of the ABC and SK Presidents, is elected publicly to a 3-year term and can be re-elected up to 3 terms in succession. The day-to-day administration of the city is handled by the city administrator.

== Tourism ==
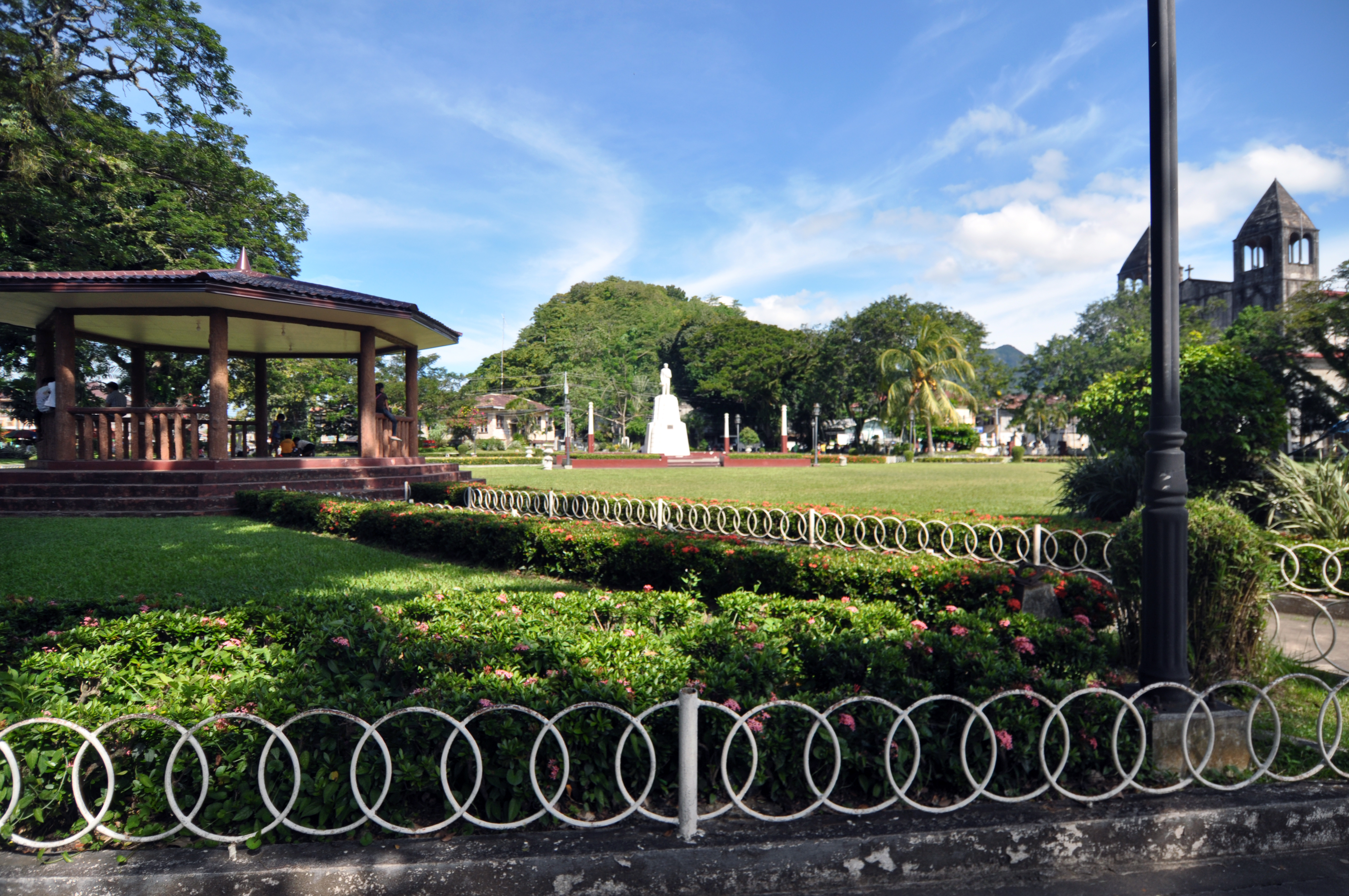
Liwasan ng Dapitan (Dapitan City Plaza)

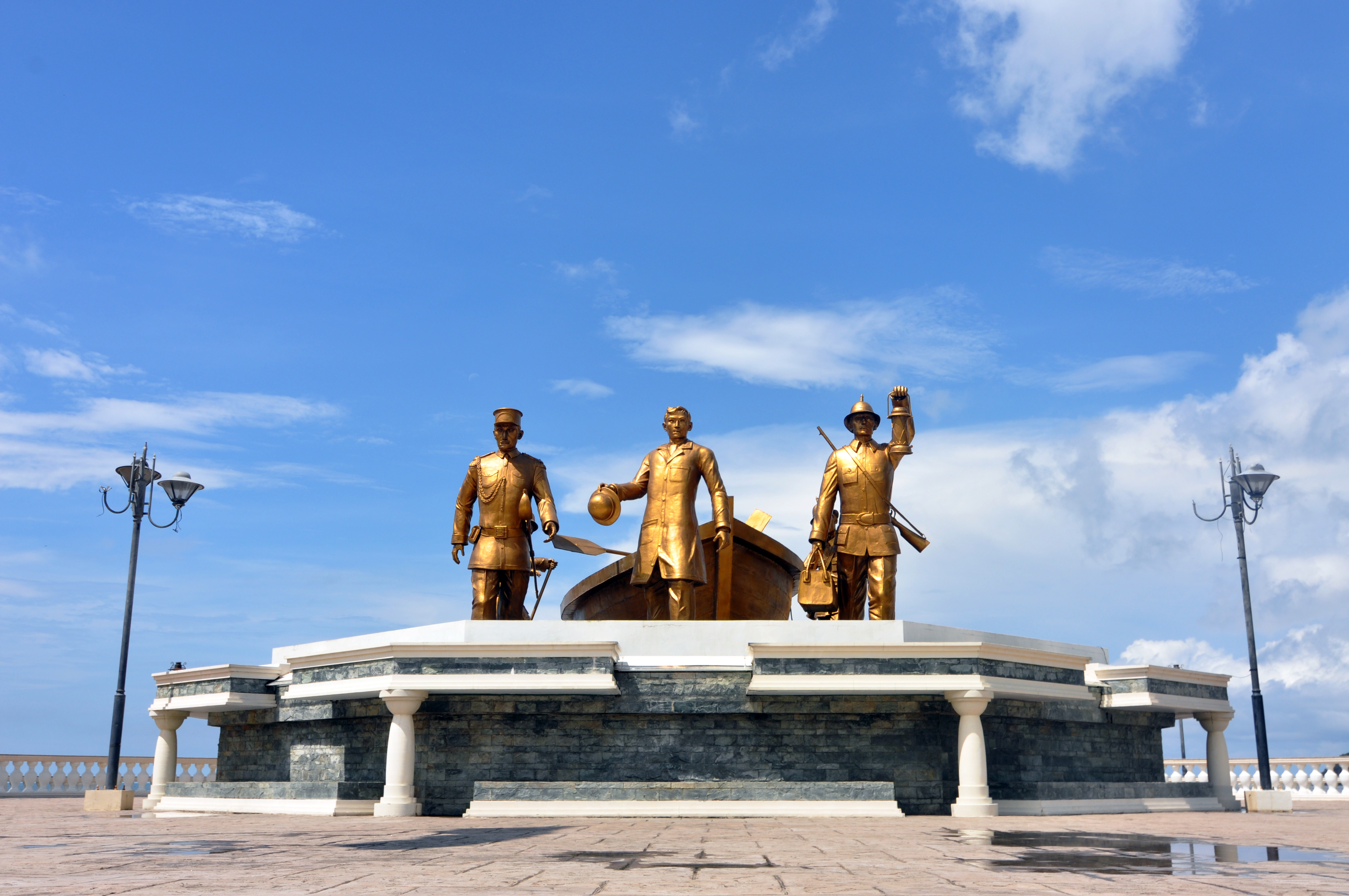
Punto del Desembarco de Rizal

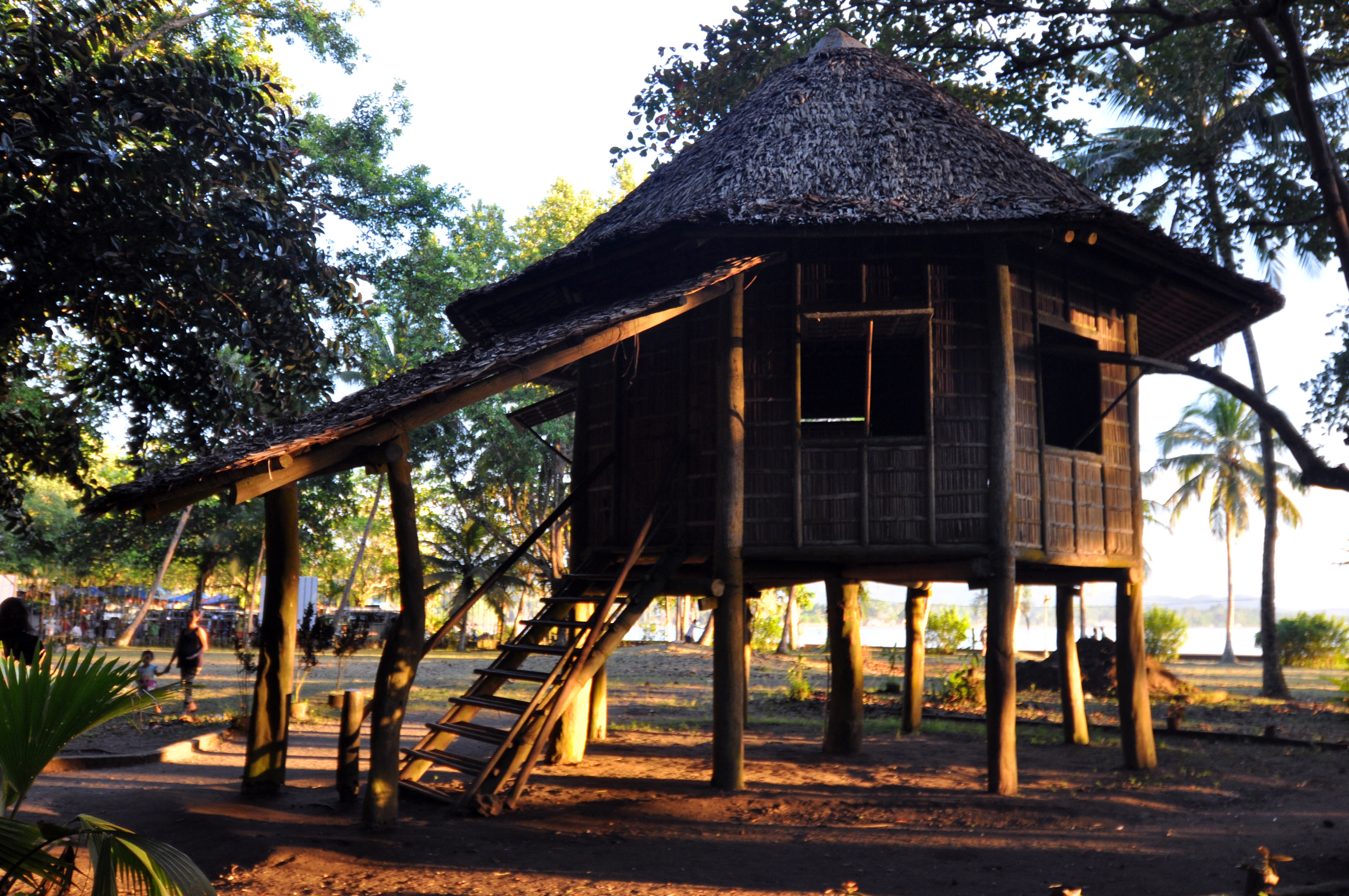
Rizal Shrine

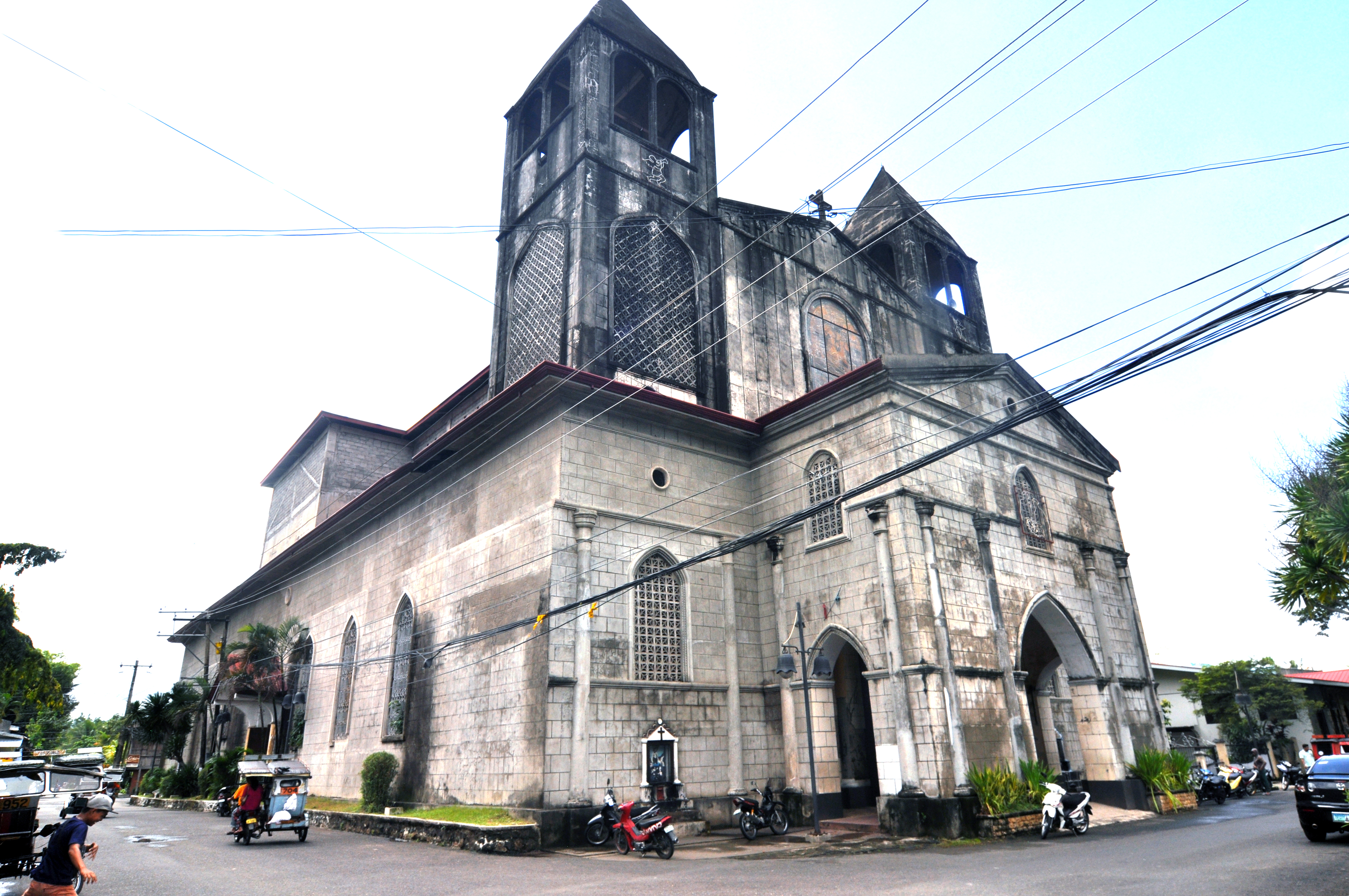
St. James the Greater Parish

Liwasan ng Dapitan (Dapitan City Plaza)
Dapitan City Plaza ("Liwasan ng Dapitan"), also known as the City Square, was beautified and developed by Dr. José Rizal during his exile. With the assistance of the Spanish Politico-Military Governor of Dapitan, Gov. Ricardo Carnicero, Rizal made the City Square comparable to those he saw in Europe. It has an area of one hectare, more or less.

Punto del Desembarco de Rizal
Rizal disembarked in Punto del Desembarco de Rizal (Rizal's Point of Disembarking). A 20-foot cross also stands in the place to symbolize the propagation of Christianity in the locality of Dapitan.

Rizal Park and Shrine
Rizal Park and Shrine is a major historical landmark in Dapitan. In August 1892, Rizal, together with Governor Carnicero and Francisco Equilor, a Spaniard living in Dipolog, won a lottery bet which financially enabled Dr. Rizal to buy a 10-hectare piece of land from Lucia Pagbangon. Rizal moved to the area in which the shrine currently stands in March 1893. Later on, his mother, Doña Teodora Alonso Realonda, his sisters, and some relatives from Calamba, Laguna, came and lived with him in Barangay Talisay (which is where the shrine is located) until 1896. Rizal Shrine was declared a national shrine through Presidential Decree No. 105 issued by then-President Ferdinand Marcos on January 24, 1973.

Casa Real
Rizal stayed in Casa Real with Governor Carnicero from his arrival until he moved to the present-day location of Rizal Shrine in Barangay Talisay in March 1893. The appearance of Casa Real is similar to that of the old city hall, with bamboo on each side and the upper portion made up of wood. A replica of Casa Real will soon rise near its marker.

St. James the Greater Church
This church was built in 1871 in honor of St. James the Greater, Dapitan's patron saint. The design of the interior walls is more or less one meter thick and still original except for the furnishing. The altar and the interior hane undergone several renovations. Inside is a historical spot where Rizal stood while hearing Mass every Sunday. At the mezzanine is the priceless heritage organ that bears the year wherein it was made – 1827 – at the choir loft. It was brought to Dapitan by the Augustinian Recollect fathers. A German-made instrument with European pipes, it is a manual pipe organ.

Cotta de Dapitan
Established in 1761, the fort was made to monitor the waters of northern Zamboanga. The fort was made on top of the sacred Ilihan Hill. Currently, the fort is in dire need of conservation.

== Festivals ==
Dapitan has launched a diversified fiesta celebration of its Patron St. James or Señor Santiago, whose memorial is celebrated every July 25, for the locals through a three-in-one affair, combining religious, cultural and sports events in its Kinabayo Festival.

The Kinabayo Festival kicks off July 16 and culminates on July 31 with various events taking place within the Shrine City of the Philippines.

== Transportation ==
=== Sea ===
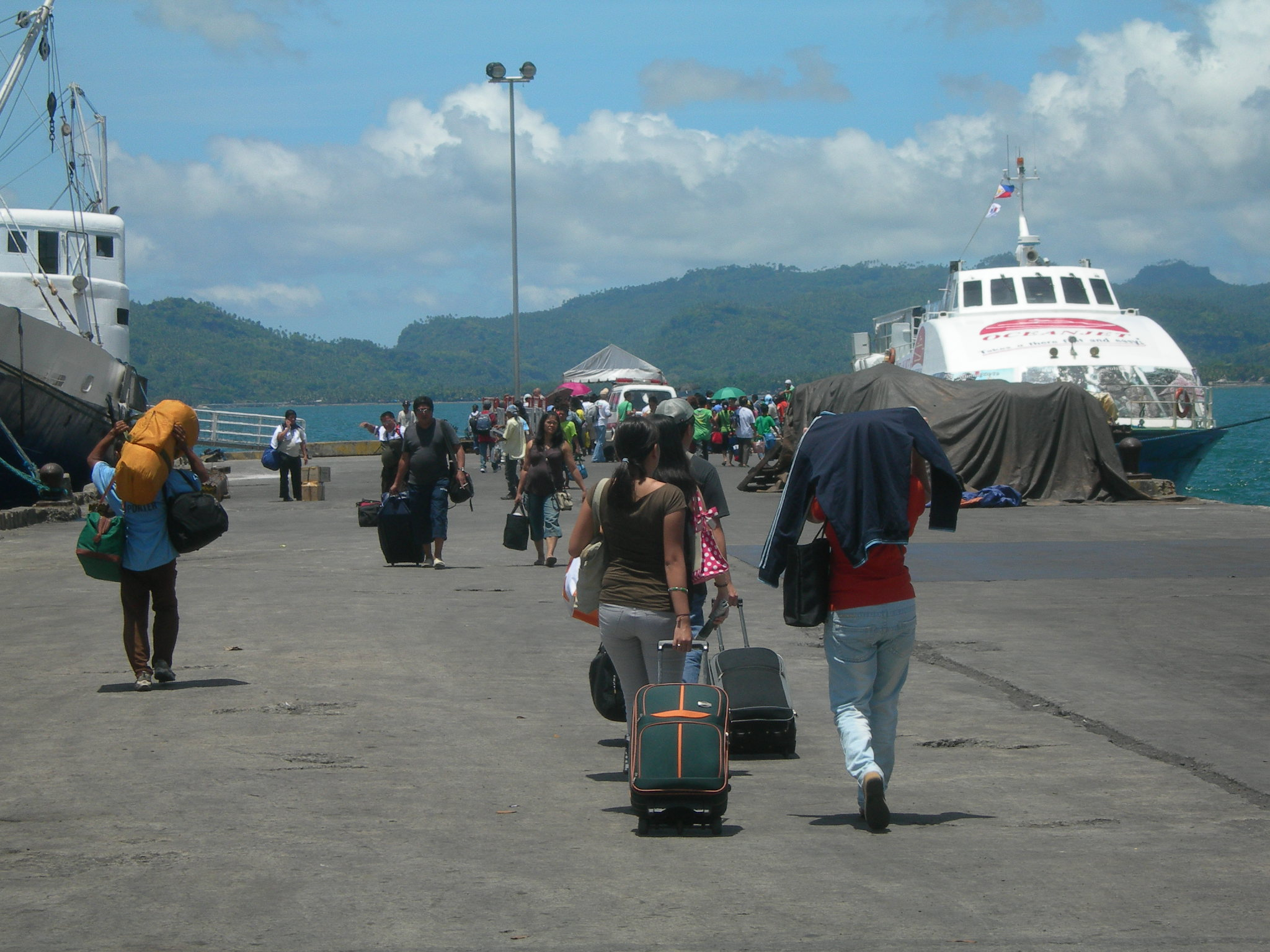
Port of Pulauan

Dapitan is served by the Port of Pulauan in barangay San Vicente (albeit ferry schedules often list the destination as Port of Dipolog, a neighboring city). There are daily ferries from/to Dumaguete and from/to Cebu City.

=== Air ===
Dapitan is catered by Dipolog Airport through Philippine Airlines, and Cebu Pacific. From Dipolog take a shuttle bus to Dapitan which is 20–30 minutes ride, that's 12 kilometers from the airport to the City proper of Dapitan.

== Notable personalities ==
- José Rizal (b. 1861 - d. 1896) - national hero
- Martha Cecilia (b. 1953 - d. 2014) - Filipino writer of Tagalog romance pocketbook novels
- Gazini Ganados (b. 1995) - Filipino fashion model and beauty pageant titleholder who became Binibining Pilipinas 2019 Universe and part of Top 20 of Miss Universe 2019.
- Theodore Boborol (b. 1979) - A renowned film and television director in the Philippines.
- El Czar Galleposo (b. 1996) - A photochemist.
- Ernalyn Daymiel (b. 1997) - Famous DotA 2 player from Dapitan City.

== Sister cities ==
=== Local ===
- Zamboanga City, Philippines
- Dipolog, Philippines
- Davao City, Philippines

=== International ===
- Litoměřice, Czech Republic
