= Dingle, Iloilo =

Municipality in Iloilo, Philippines

Dingle Baong Sumandig
- Municipality
- Municipality of Dingle
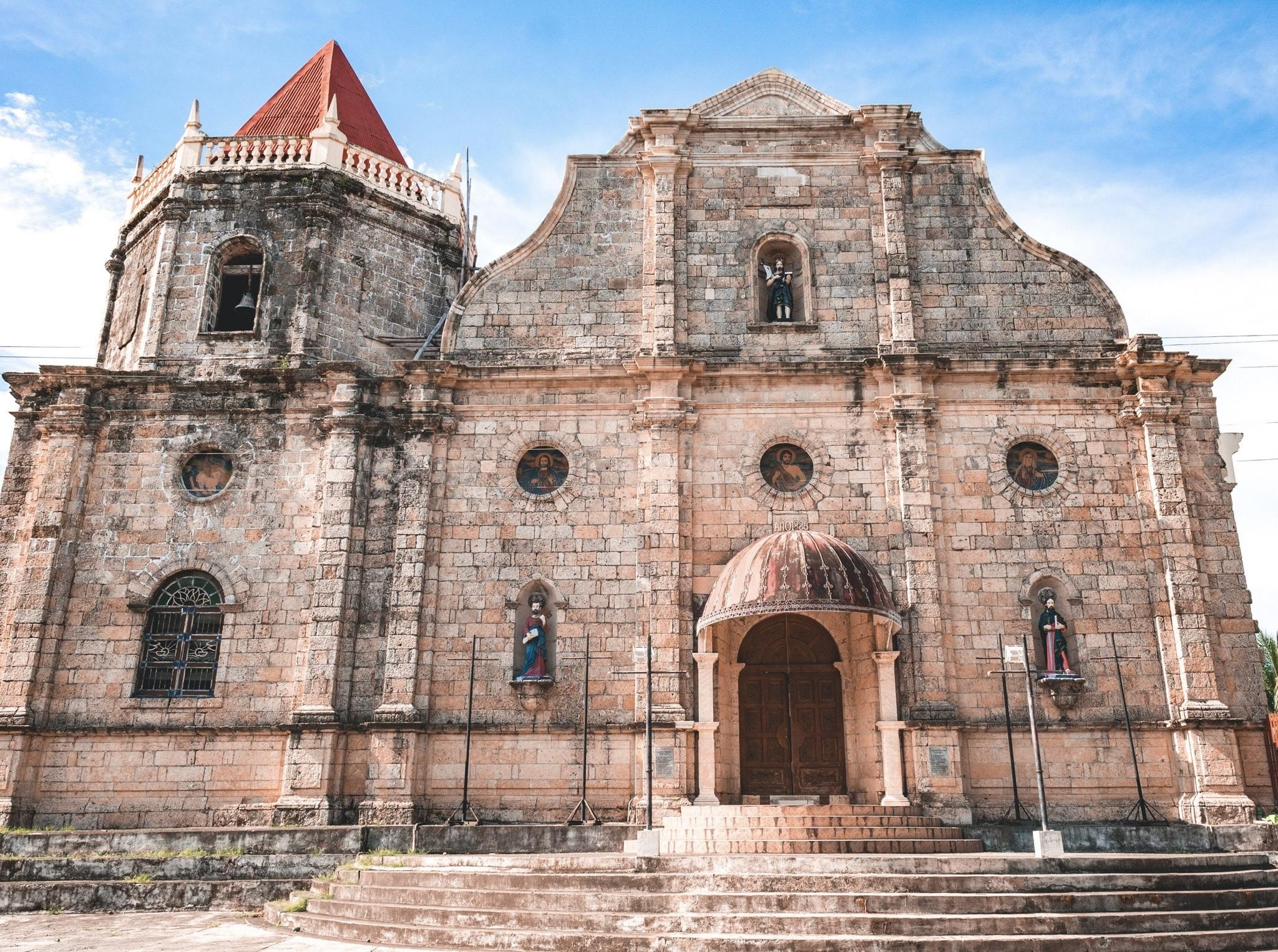
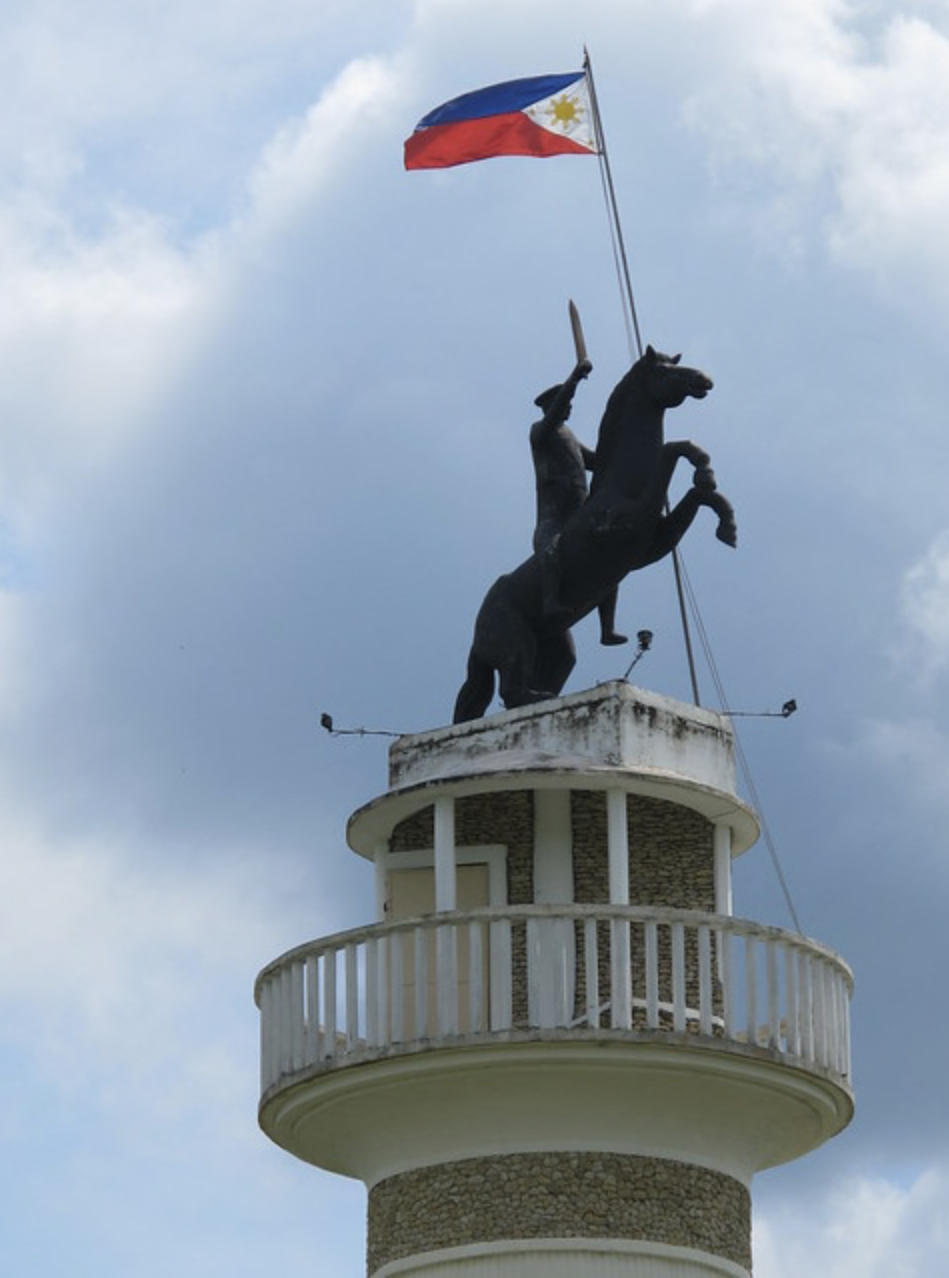
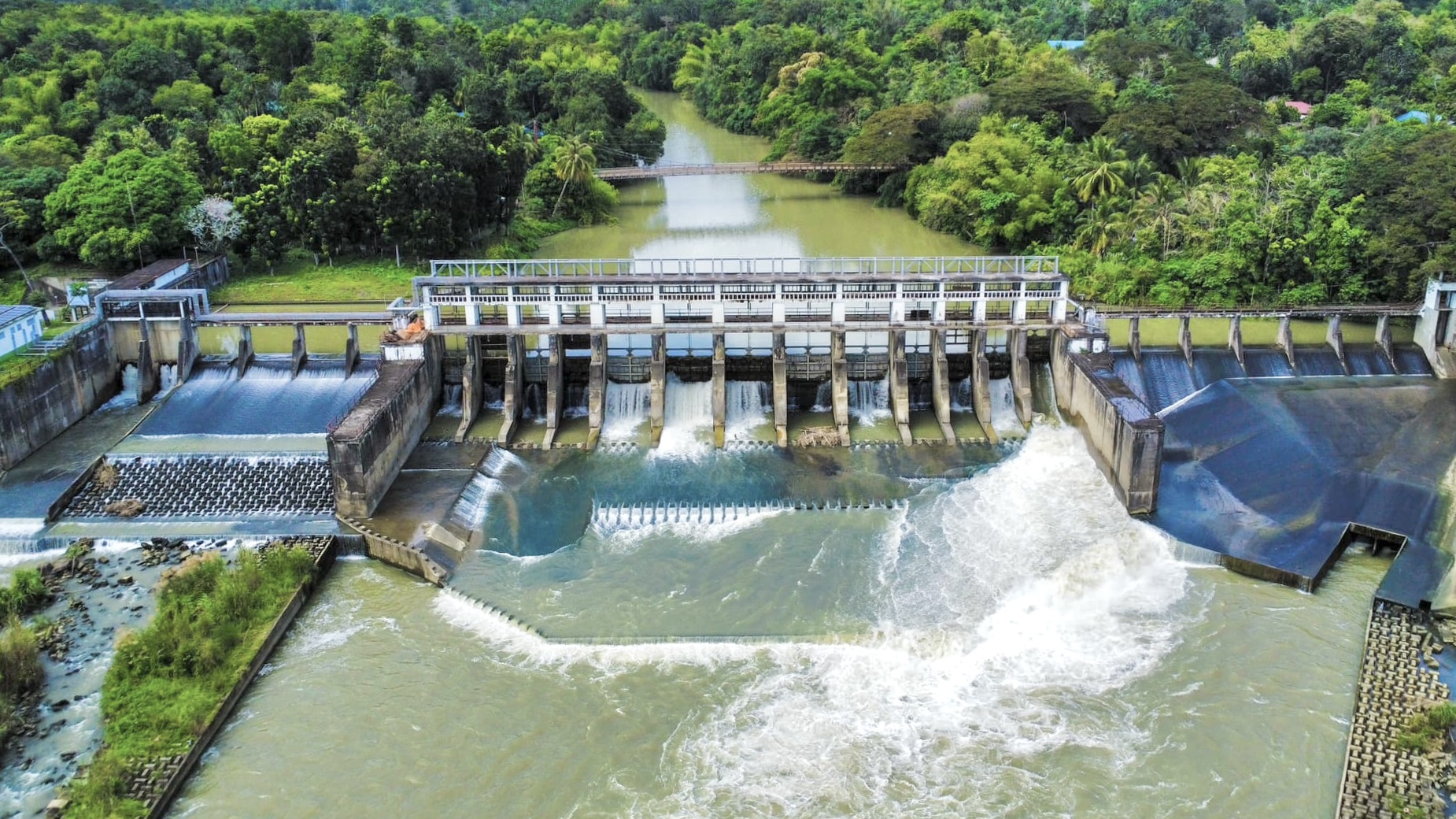
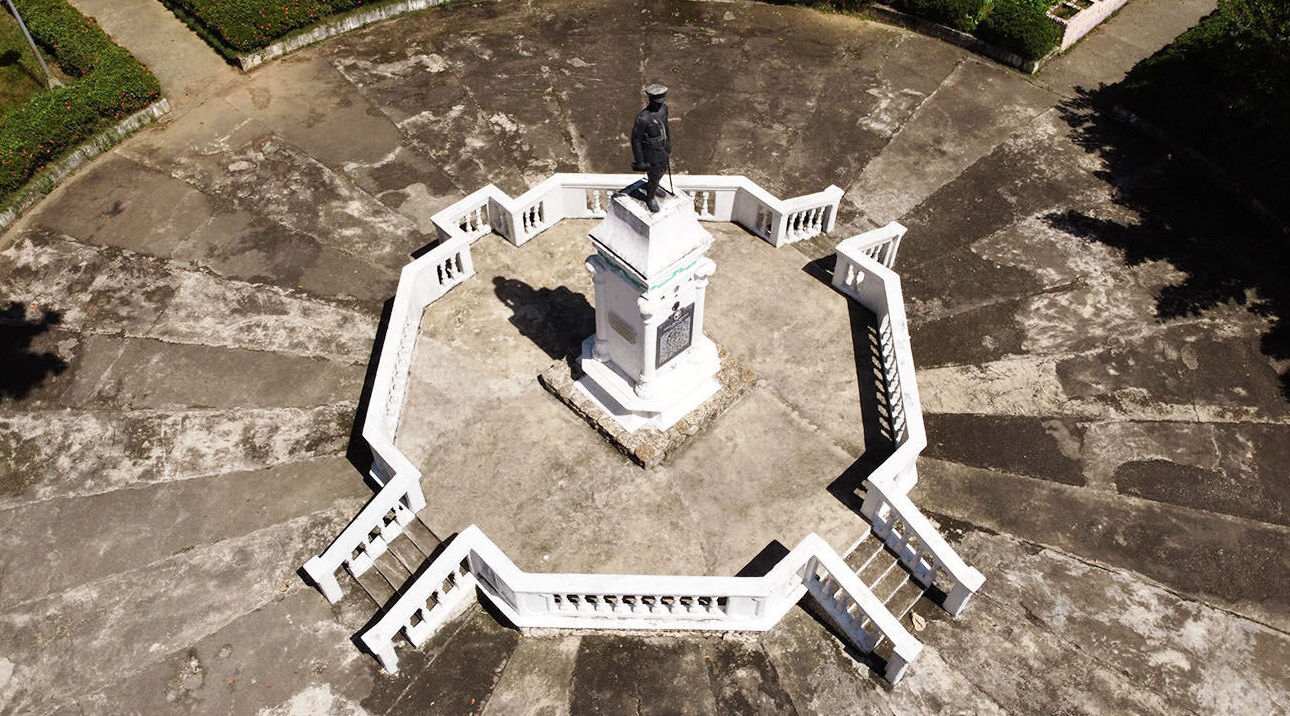
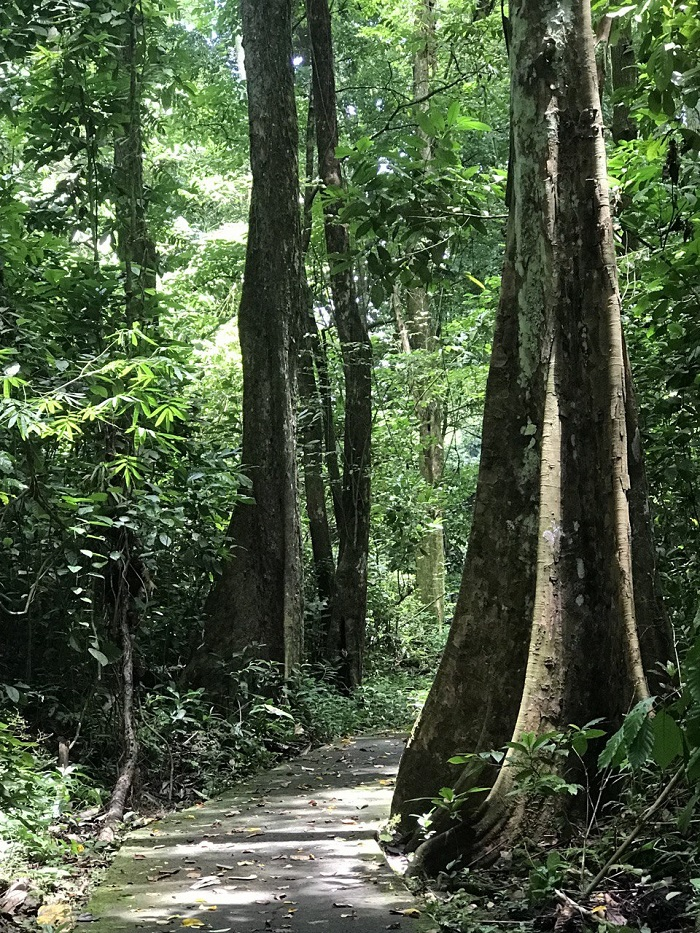
- St. John the Baptist Parish Church Memorial to the Cry of Lincud Heroes Jalaur Diversion Irrigation Dam Adriano Dayot Hernandez Shrine Bulabog Putian National Park

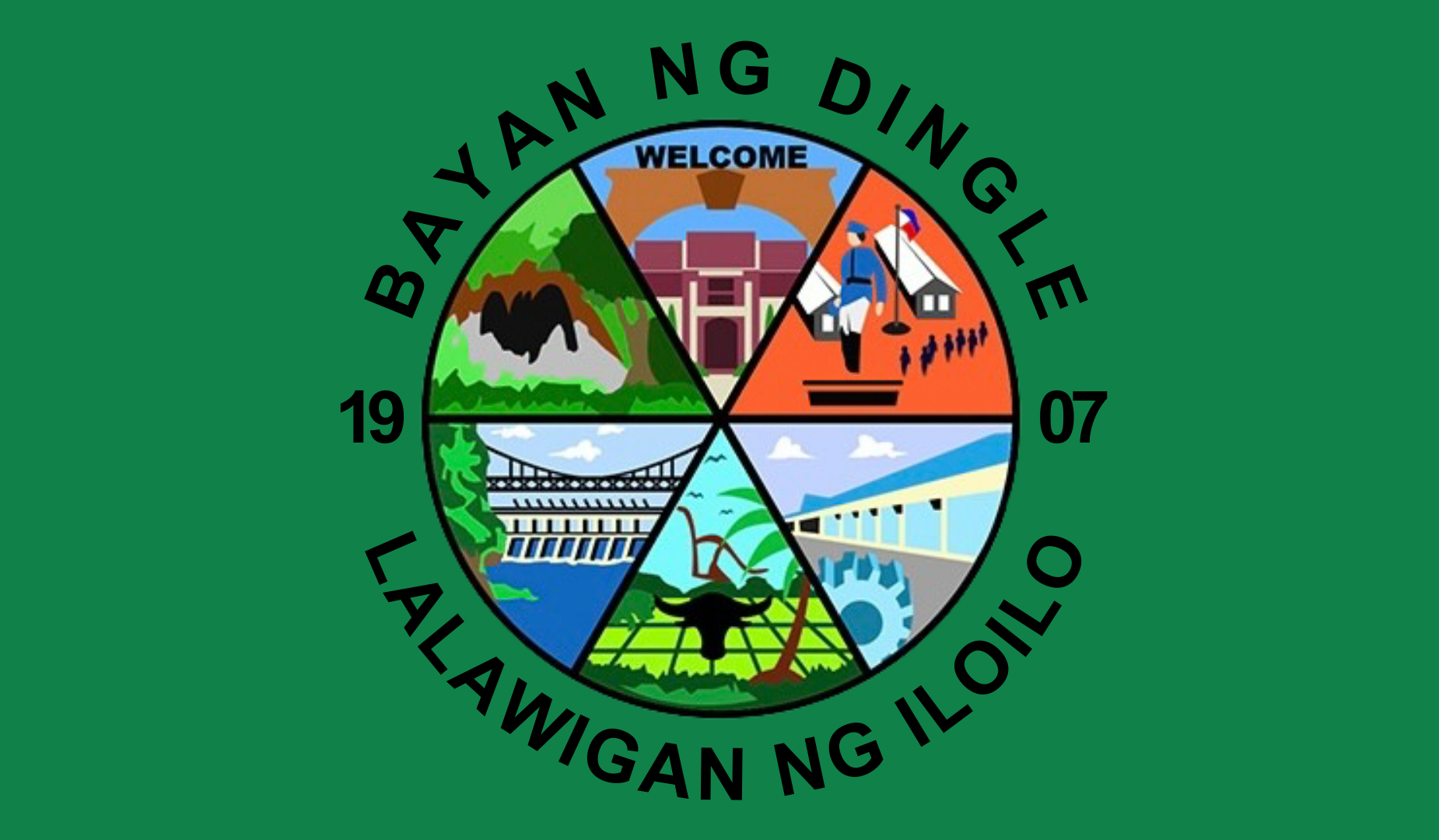
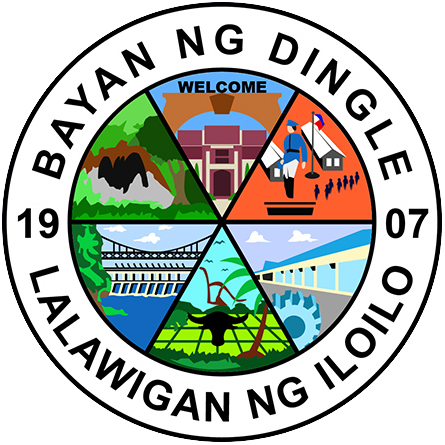
- Flag Seal
- Etymology: dingding maingle (Old Kinaray-a: hard wall)
- Nickname: Spelunker's Paradise
- Anthem: Town of Dingle Dingle nga Matahúm (Dingle the Beautiful)
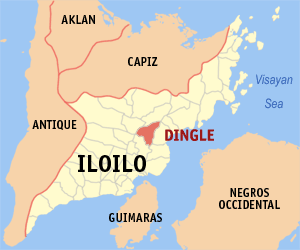
- Map of Iloilo with Dingle highlighted
- Interactive map of Dingle
- Location within the Philippines
- Coordinates: 11°03′N 122°40′E
- Country: Philippines
- Region: Western Visayas
- Province: Iloilo
- District: 4th district
- Founded as a visita of Pototan: 1593 (Diego Álvarez, OSA)
- Established as the pueblo of Baong: 1611 (Pedro del Castillo, OSA)
- Annexed to Dumangas: 1629
- Re-established as the pueblo of Baong: 1634 (Alonso de Méntrida, OSA)
- Annexed to Laglag: 1641
- Founded as the pueblo of Dingle: 1823 (Juan Marcelino Dayot)
- Annexed to Pototan: 1904
- Chartered as the municipality of Dingle: 1907 (Adriano Hernández y Dayot)
- Barangays: 33 (see Barangays)

Government
  - Type: Sangguniang Bayan
  - Mayor: Rufino P. Palabrica III (Nacionalista)
  - Vice Mayor: Quindialem D. Villanueva (PFP)
  - Representative: Ferjenel G. Biron (Nacionalista)
  - Municipal Council: Members: Eduardo C. Bugna (Ind); Ronald A. Cahuya (Nacionalista); Mia Marie L. Pasquin (Nacionalista); Jessie M. Alecto (Nacionalista); Wenca Louise D. Ortizo (Ind); Rufino C. Sorianosos, Jr. (PFP); Jimmy C. Quicoy (PFP); Wilfredo S. Quinlat (Nacionalista); Rollie A. Pelarin ^{‡}; Raymund Domopoy ^{◌}; ‡ ex officio ABC president; ◌ ex officio SK chairman
  - Electorate: 28,060 voters (2025)

Area
  - Total: 98.37 km^{2} (37.98 sq mi)
- Elevation: 56 m (184 ft)
- Highest elevation: 318 m (1,043 ft)
- Lowest elevation: 14 m (46 ft)

Population (2024 census)
  - Total: 46,032
  - Density: 467.9/km^{2} (1,212/sq mi)
  - Households: 11,698
- Demonym(s): Filipino: Taga-Dingle; Kinaray-a: Dingleanon; Hiligaynon: Dingleanon; Spanish: dingleño (m), -ña (f)

Economy
  - Income class: 1st municipal income class
  - Poverty incidence: 14.35% (2023)
  - Revenue: ₱ 242 million (2024)
  - Assets: ₱ 1,058 million (2024)
  - Expenditure: ₱ 174.4 million (2024)
  - Liabilities: ₱ 101.5 million (2024)

Service provider
  - Electricity: Iloilo 2 Electric Cooperative (ILECO 2)
- Time zone: UTC+8 (PST)
- ZIP code: 5035
- PSGC: 063016000
- IDD : area code: +63 (0)33
- Native languages: Karay-a; Hiligaynon; Tagalog

Dingle (IPA: [ˈdiŋlɛʔ], locally /ˈdiŋliʔ/), officially the Municipality of Dingle (Kinaray-a: Banwa ka Dingle, Hiligaynon: Banwa sang Dingle, Tagalog: Bayan ng Dingle), is a 1st municipal income class municipality in the province of Iloilo, Philippines. According to the 2024 census, it has a population of 46,032 people.

The town is known for its baroque-architecture church and its archaeological cave sites, such as the Lapuz Lapuz Cave, famous for revealing the hunter-gatherer lives of the ancient people of Panay.

== Etymology ==
The name Dingle is believed to have been formed by joining the Old Karay-a words dingding for wall, and maingle for hard. This hard wall refers to a rock formation found on the banks of the Jalaur River in barangay Namatay situated in the eastern part of the municipality. Locally, this hard wall is known as dalipe or tampi.

Before the Spanish contact, the town was known as Sumandig after an Ati datu of the same name. The name means "to lean one thing to another" in the Karay-a language. The settlement however was officially called Baong upon its establishment as a visita in 1593 by the Augustinians. The name comes from the physical form of the settlement which was situated in a depression surrounded by low rising hills. The said name translates to kawa or vat, a cooking utensil similar to, but very much bigger than a carajay. Baong is also a Dioscoridea named Cultivated Dioscorea, and papillary Dioscorea by Fray Francisco Manuel Blanco.

== History ==
=== Early history ===
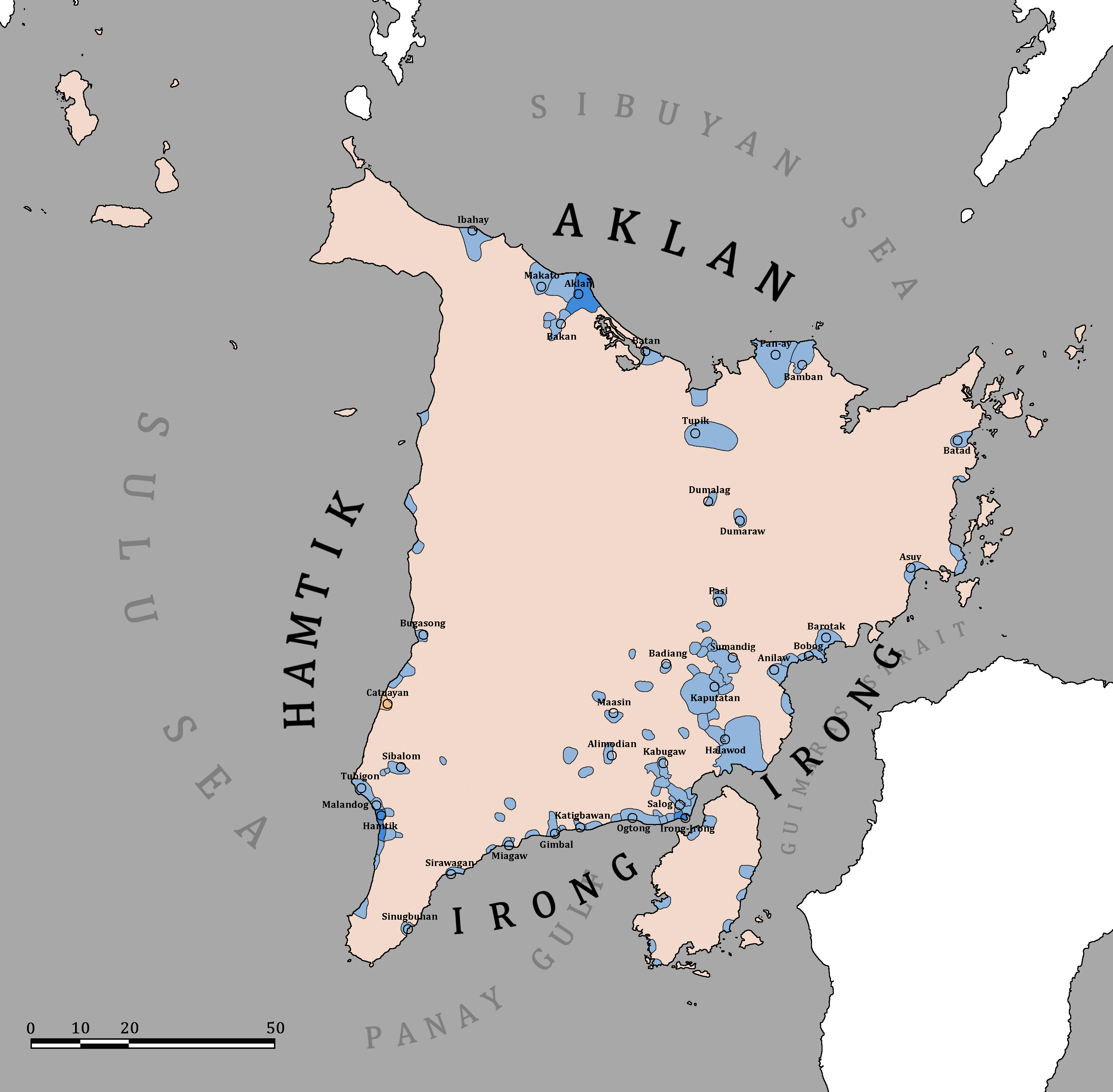
Map of Panay showing the ancient polities belonging to the Confederation of Madja-as. The ancient banwa of Sumandig in the sakup of Irong-irong form the present-day municipalities of Dingle and Dueñas.

At around 1212, the site of modern-day Dingle was under the jurisdiction of Simsiman. The area was first inhabited by the Ati or Panay Negritos with Pulpulan as chief. Under Marikudo, son of Pulpulan, Simsiman remained as the seat of government of the Ati polity. The settlement was eventually called Sumandig after an Ati ruler whose domain covered the areas along Mount Putian from current-day barangay Lincud in the north to Suague river in the south and from the creek up to present-day barangay Alegria in the west. Sumandig's seat of government is present-day sitio Mananiw in barangay Tabugon, Dingle.

Buyóng Labaw Donggon (lit. "Most Honored"), the first Malay datu of Sumandig in the 29,000-verse epic Hinilawod and "the most high god, all-powerful, magnanimous, a god of gifts and graces" in the Suludnon society and in the old Panayan religion, built his home with his wife Uwang Matan-ayon (lit. "Generous One") beside the spring of Moroboro in Dingle. Matan-ayon was a daughter of Datu Paiburong, the first ruler of Irong-irong.

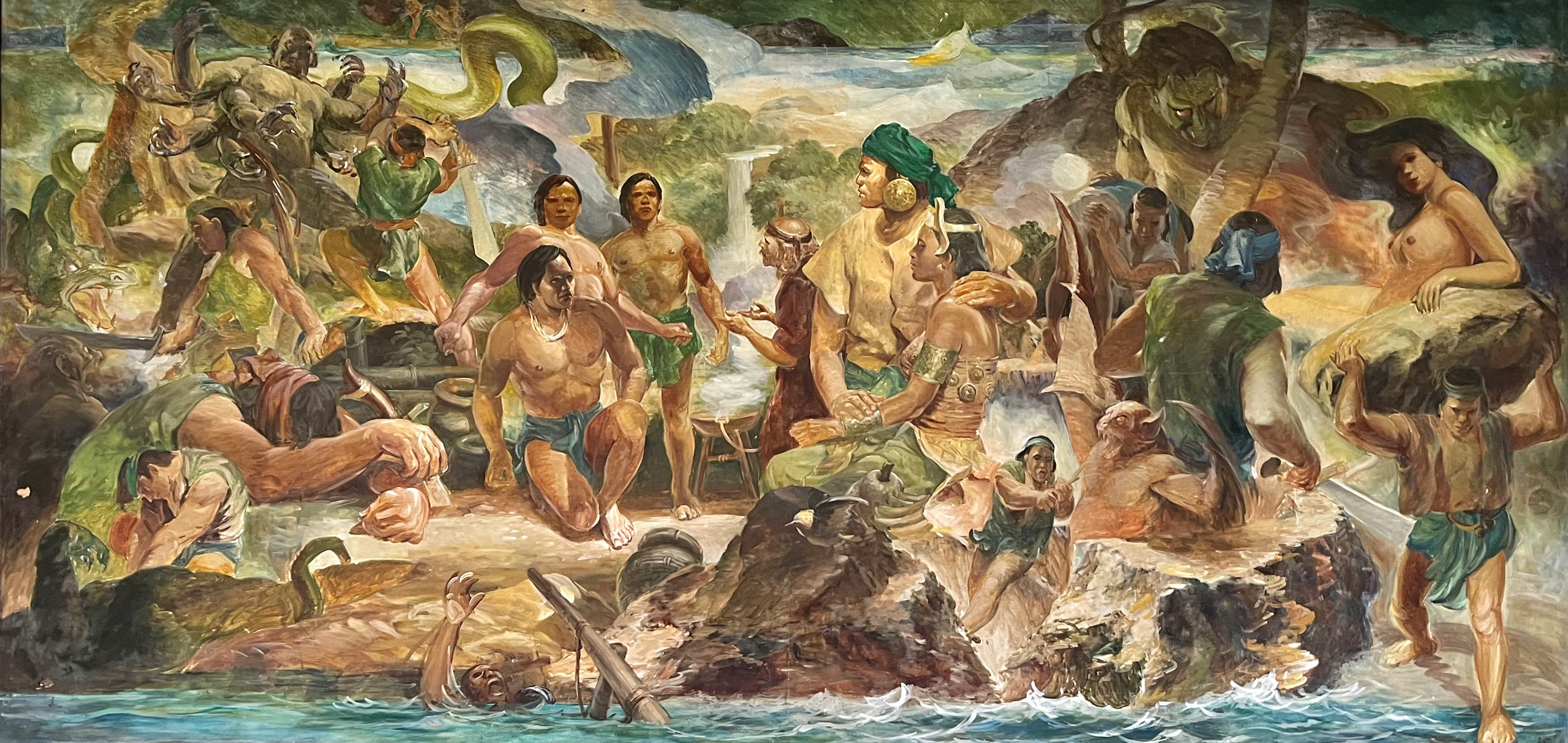
Labaw Donggon and Matan-ayon, folk heroes of the ancient Visayan epic Hinilawod and progenitors of the pre-colonial kadatuan and the Spanish-colonial principalía of Dingle, who settled by the spring of Moroboro in Dingle.

Sumandig, which was then a district of Sibucao, had a rock believed to have been Labaw Donggon's throne. There, wedding ceremonies were held by the natives to ask for his blessings. It is said that the god took two lovers whose parents were not in favor of their love, for 25 years the lovers adored each other without ever seeing the light of the sun, "living in the fantastic mansion of Dinglian divinity"; so those who yearn for true love, sacrifice offerings before his altar. Young maidens sigh and exclaim, "Abao, Labao Dung-gon, taga-i aco bana! (Oh, Labaw Donggon, give me a husband!)" The Augustinian Hernando Morales destroyed the rock in 1598, removing every bit of it. It was noted that there were still native mundos of Dingle who worshipped Labaw Donggon even until the last years of Spanish rule in the Philippines. These worshippers would stealthily enter a certain cave in the evening of a certain day of the year in order to render homage and to offer burnt offerings of poultry, doves, rice, bananas, and pigs to the ancient Visayan god. It took the Augustinians two centuries to uproot the custom of offering sacrifices to Labaw Donggon.

=== Spanish colonial era ===
In 1586, Datu Disayaran, the chief of Siwaragan who traces his descent from Labaw Donggon of Sumandig, and his son Datu Bantugan, led the serious abortive revolt against the Spaniards in Dingle, known at this point as Baong, by the descendants of the settlers from Borneo, the native priests called maaram, and the marauding Ati who refused conversion to the Catholic faith. Said revolt was the first revolt against Spanish rule in Panay.

Fray Diego Álvarez of the Augustinians founded Baong as a visita of Pototan in 1593. Pototan, a village then ruined, was briefly annexed to Baong after the former's population significantly decreased. Accordingly, a church was built in Baong. Around this time, Baong had a population of more than 1,000 and was a well-known place for recreation. Baong became a pueblo on its own right on April 23, 1611. The Estado of 1612 indicates that Baong had two priests to attend 800 tributos or 2,400 souls.

1614 Dutch Attack

In 1614, a Dutch fleet of 10 galleons under the command of Joris van Spilbergen were seen in Iloilo waters. Fray Diego de Oseguera, parish priest of Baong, and Fray Juan de Lecea, the Augustinian prior of Ogtong, came to Baong with supplies and did much to placate the people of Baong who were completely restless after seeing how little the Spaniards could do against the Dutch. The friars brought the valuable things of the convent of Ogtong to Baong into a karacoa, while the rest were buried which they later found. What was supposed to be a day's journey, the group reached Baong in two days. Fray Alonso de Méntrida was first to arrive in Baong from Ogtong where he was welcomed by Fray Diego Oseguera. Although the convent was poor, they acted as if they were wealthy. They shared all the rice and beef of the convent with all the fugitives who kept coming every moment, without taking account of anything. 300 native allies who joined the Spaniards have been cornered and were unable to go anywhere because the natives were also at war. Through the intervention of the friars, the townspeople were led back to the pueblo after they have hunkered down from the mountains while soldiers were dying from lack of food after all the rice and every supply in the convent have been consumed. Fray Francisco Encinas of the Society of Jesus also came to hide in the convent of Baong.

This convent of Baong [Dingle] had more than one thousand Indians, and was a well-known place for recreation; but now, although it endures, it has but six hundred Indians. As it is remote from trade, and situated inland, residence there is regarded as exile.

— Juan de Medina, OSA (Augustinian friar), Historia de la Orden de S. Agustín de Estas Islas Filipinas, 1630

In 1617, the prior of Baong was asked to contribute an annual rent of 10 pesos to the Monastery of Santo Niño in Cebu.

In 1628, the pueblo of Baong and its visitas had two Augustinian priests and a population of 2,400. In 1629, however, the pueblo was nearly depopulated because of the incursion of the Ati and run-away slaves who destroyed farms and killed most of the settlement's population. Although the pueblo endured, only about 600 of the inhabitants survived. As it is remote from trade and situated inland in Panay, residence here was regarded as exile. During the same year, Baong was made a mere visita of Dumangas. This was motivated by the decrease in population, as many townspeople had left because of fear of the Atis, the so-called remontados, who would suddenly come down from the mountains to plunder their ricefields.

In 1634, Fray Alonso de Méntrida managed to secure a seemingly independent existence for the settlement but in 1641, the pueblo became so small when it was again depopulated that it was annexed as a visita to Laglag, present-day Dueñas, and remained as such for 182 years. Not even the report of Augustinian Father Provincial Pedro Velasco in 1760 mentioned it. For the next two centuries, Baong will be sharing its history with Laglag.

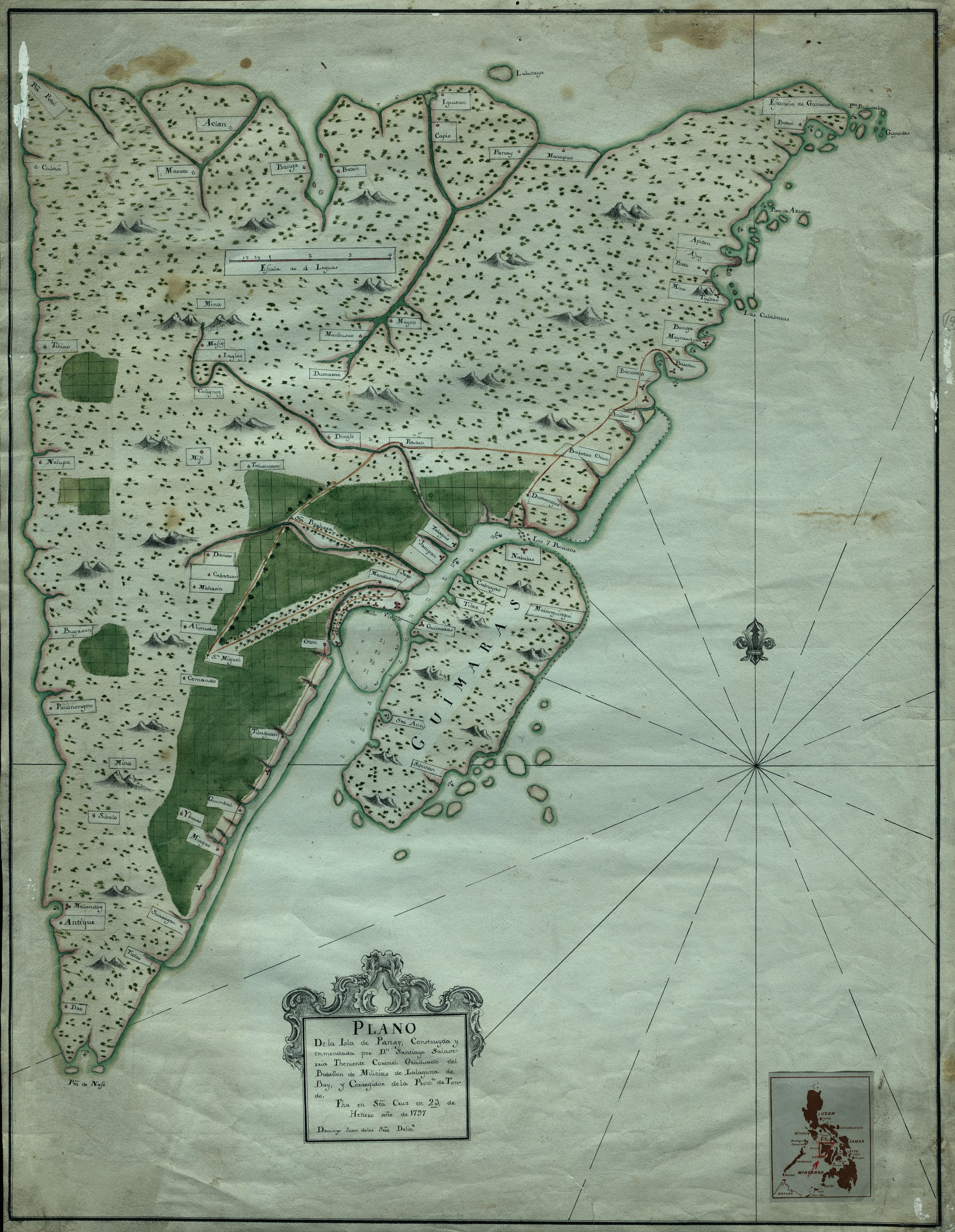
The 1797 Salaverría map of Panay showing the visita of Dingle in the heart of the island which was then under the jurisdiction of the pueblo of Laglag

Re-establishment of the pueblo

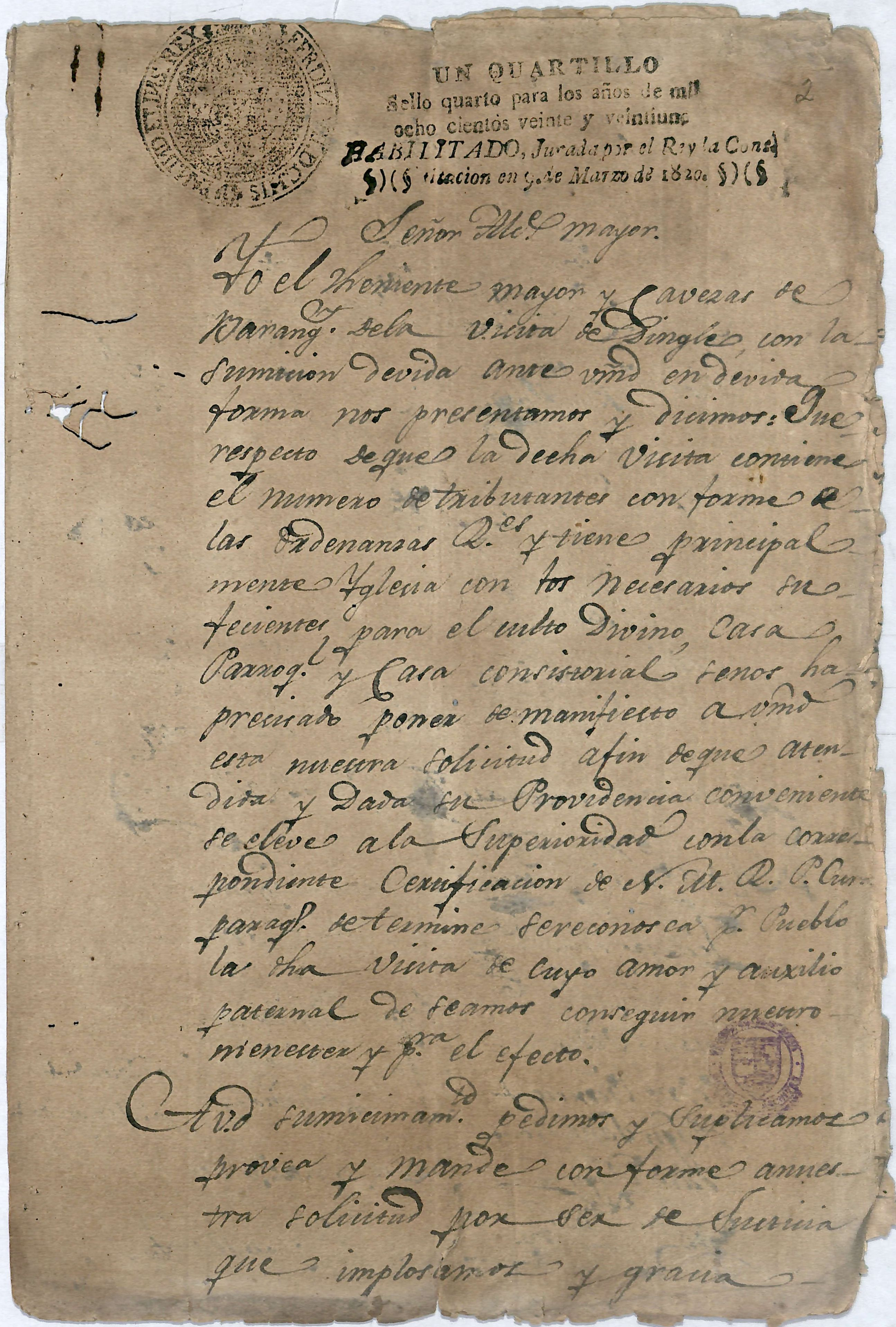
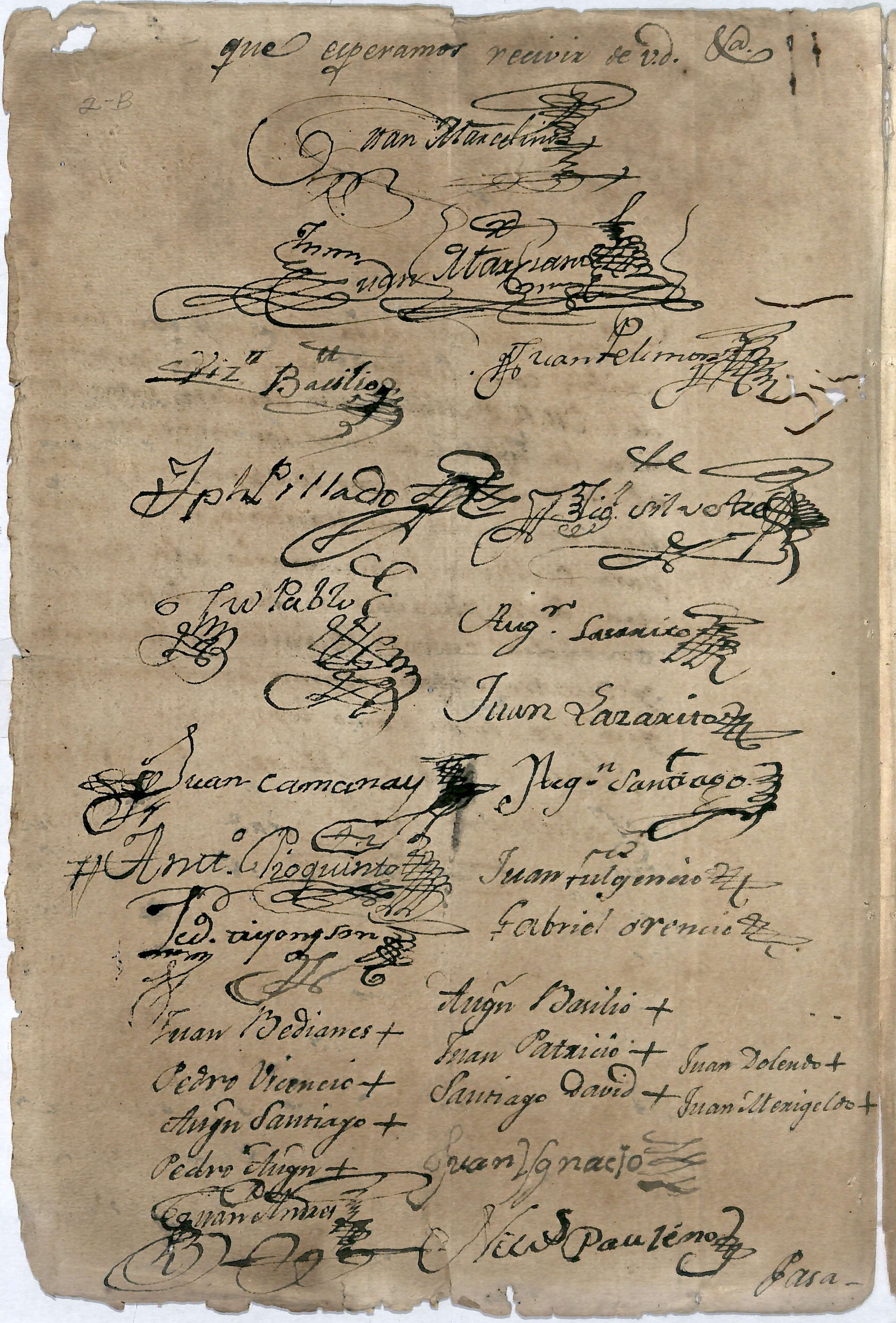
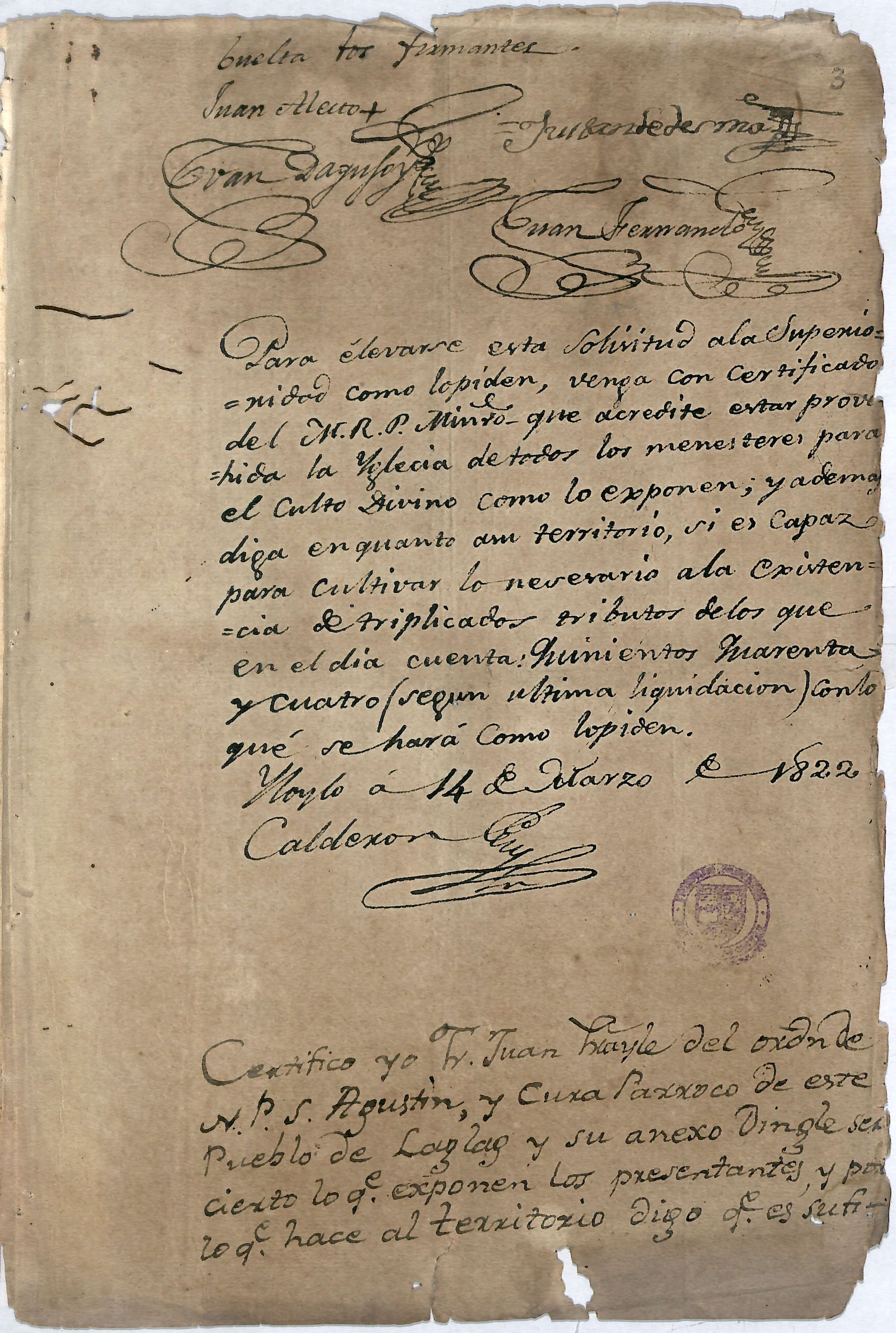
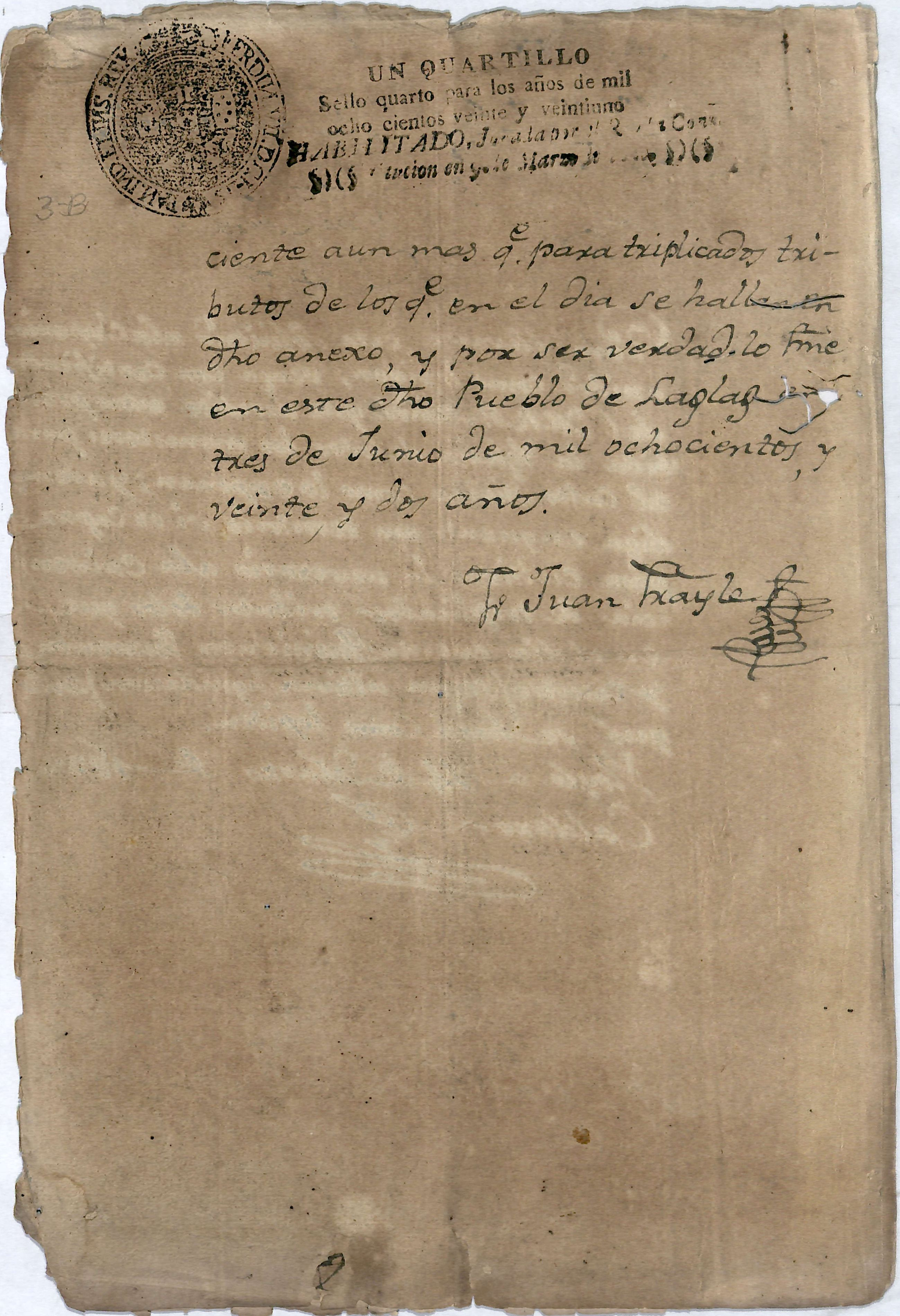
Petition of Don Juan Marcelino Dayot, teniente mayor of Laglag, dated March 8, 1820 to Iloilo alcalde mayor Miguel Calderón for the re-elevation of the visita of Dingle into a pueblo, as supported by the 31 cabezas de barangay of Dingle and the endorsement of Fray Juan Frayle, parish priest of Laglag.

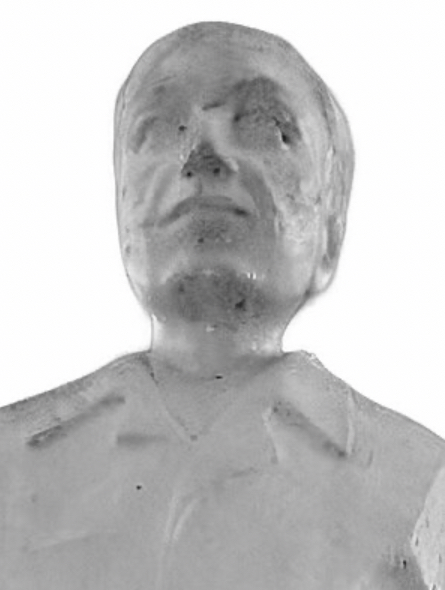
Don Luís Cantalicio Dayot y del Rosario, the longest-serving gobernadorcillo of Dingle (1853–1861, 1869–1873)

On March 8, 1820, with the support of 31 cabezas de barangay of the principalía or the hispanized Christian descendants of the pre-colonial datus of Dingle and certification of the parish priest of Laglag, Fray Juan Frayle, OSA (Dingle cura párroco, 1829–1849), a petition for the re-elevation of Dingle into a pueblo was submitted to Miguel Calderón, alcalde mayor (equivalent to the present-day provincial governor) of Iloilo, through the leadership of the Dingleño teniente mayor (deputy gobernadorcillo) of Laglag, Don Juan Marcelino Dayot (Dingle gobernadorcillo, 1829–1835).

On April 28, 1823, Dingle was thus re-elevated into a pueblo after five years under Dumangas and 182 years under Laglag. Its first gobernadorcillo in almost 200 years was Don Julio Dator (1823–1827). In 1829, during the tenure of Don Juan Marcelino Dayot as gobernadorcillo and Fray Juan Frayle as parish priest of Laglag, under which parish Dingle still belonged to, construction of the present church made of granite stone quarried from nearby Bulabog Putian mountains commenced. In 1838, the pueblo had 3,736 people. Two of the more notable gobernadorcillos of Dingle who sold some of their vast landholdings to pay for the tributes of their constituents were Don Magdaleno Muyco (1835–1843, 1851–1853) and Don Luís Cantalicio Dayot (1853–1861, 1869–1873), respectively better known to the Dingleanons as Tan Mano and Tan Cantaling.

On November 21, 1849, governor-general Clavería issued a decree requiring Filipinos to adopt Spanish and indigenous names from the Catalogo Alfabetico de Apellidos for civil and legal purposes. Upon the orders of Iloilo alcalde mayor Felipe Combe, surnames with the same initial letters as the initial letters of the corresponding pueblo were to be assigned. As such, surnames starting with the digraphs da- and de- were distributed to Dingle, e.g. Daguro, Dairo, Dayatan, Deaño, Deatrás.

On August 16, 1850, by order of governor-general Urbiztondo, Dingle became a parish independent from that of Laglag, recently renamed as Dueñas in 1845. Its first patron was St. Monica. It was later changed to the Assumption of Our Lady, and finally, to St. John the Baptist. In 1865, Fray Fernando Llorente y Santos ordered the continuation of the construction of the current structure of the Parish Church of St. John the Baptist which was completed in 1886. Fray Llorente, during the time when he was parish priest from 1865 to 1874, had a cemetery with a chapel built under his direction, and two schools for children of both sexes, and formed an orchestra and musical band of 42 boys whom he instructed by himself. Fray Melquiades Arizmendi continued the completion of the church from 1876 to 1887, while Fray Rafael Murillo completed the construction from 1887 to 1893. The construction of the church from Fray Llorente covered the terms of gobernadorcillos Domingo Osano, Luís Cantalicio Dayot, and Santiago and Tomás Sanico. The bell tower, however, remains unfinished to this day. In 1896, the population of Dingle swelled to 12,504.

Cry of Lincud

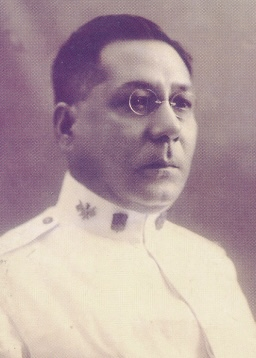
Gen. Adriano Hernández y Dayot, Hero of the Cry of Lincud

During the second phase of the Philippine Revolution against Spain during the Spanish–American War, Dingle staged the first armed uprising in the province of Iloilo and in the island of Panay. The leaders of the victorious uprising were Gen. Adriano Hernández y Dayot, Gen. Julio Hernández y Dayot, Maj. Estefano Muyco y Dayot, Maj. Nicolás Roces, Lt. Col. Francisco Jalandoni, and Col. Quintín Salas who fought together with 600 revolucionarios. Now known as the "Cry of Lincud," the revolt commenced at the house of José Dayot in Barrio Lincud on October 28, 1898. Today, this event which started the Philippine Revolution in Iloilo is commemorated as a special non-working holiday. Through Presidential Proclamation 697, October 28, 2024 was declared a special non-working day in celebration of Cry of Lincud.

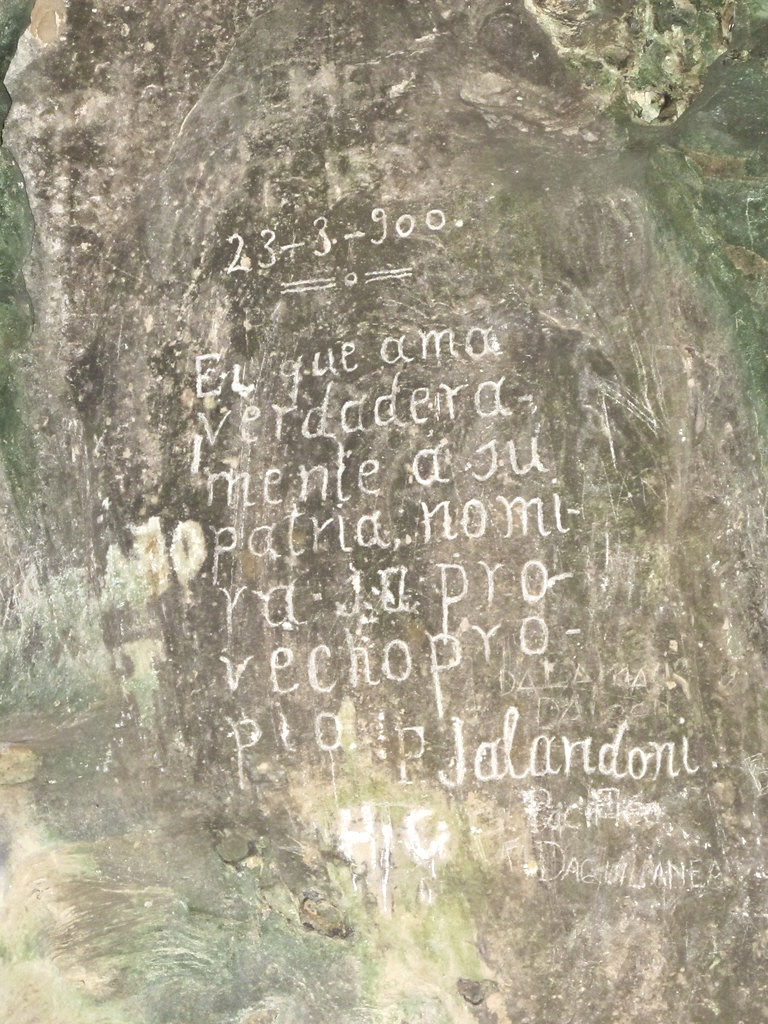
"Él que ama verdaderamente a su patria no mira su provecho propio." (He who truly loves his country does not look to his own advantage.)

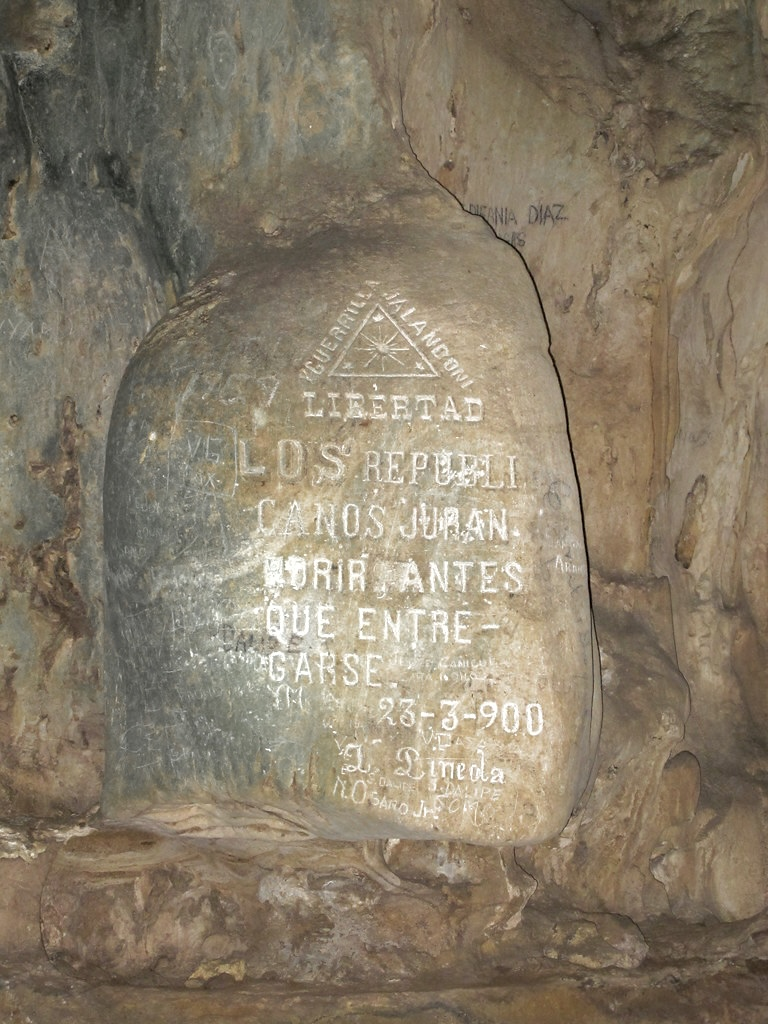
"Los Republicanos juran morir antes que entregarse." (Republicans vow to die before surrendering.)

Stone inscriptions dated March 23, 1900 by Filipino revolucionarios within the Maestranza Cave of the Bulabog Putian National Park in Dingle, Iloilo

=== American occupation ===
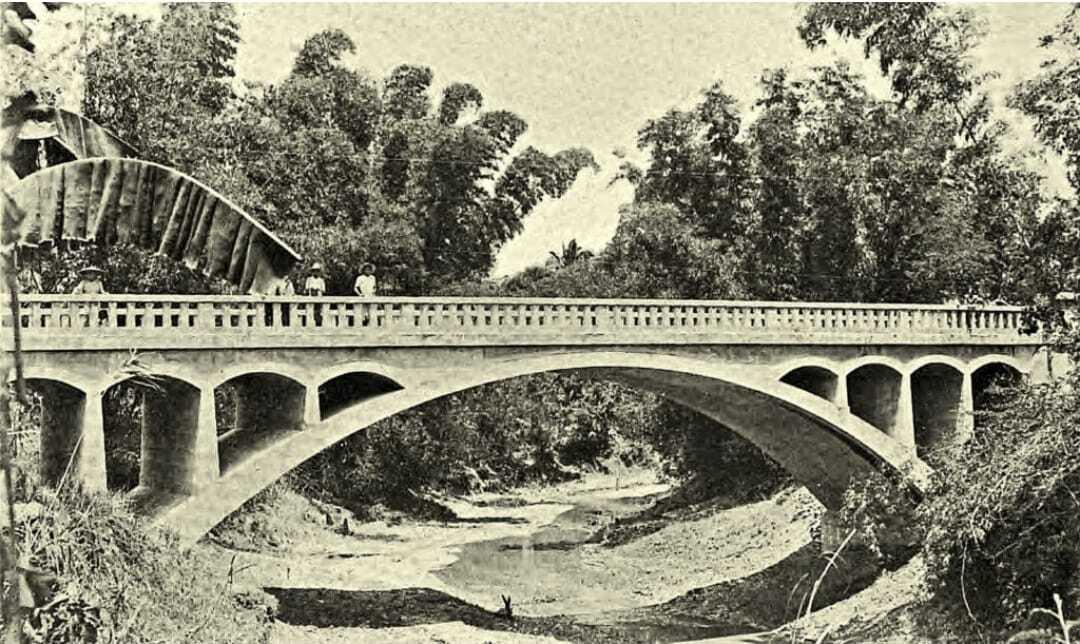
Abangay Bridge over the Abangay River between Dingle and Pototan, Iloilo. Completed and opened for traffic on June 15, 1912, during the term of Adriano Hernández y Dayot as Iloilo governor.

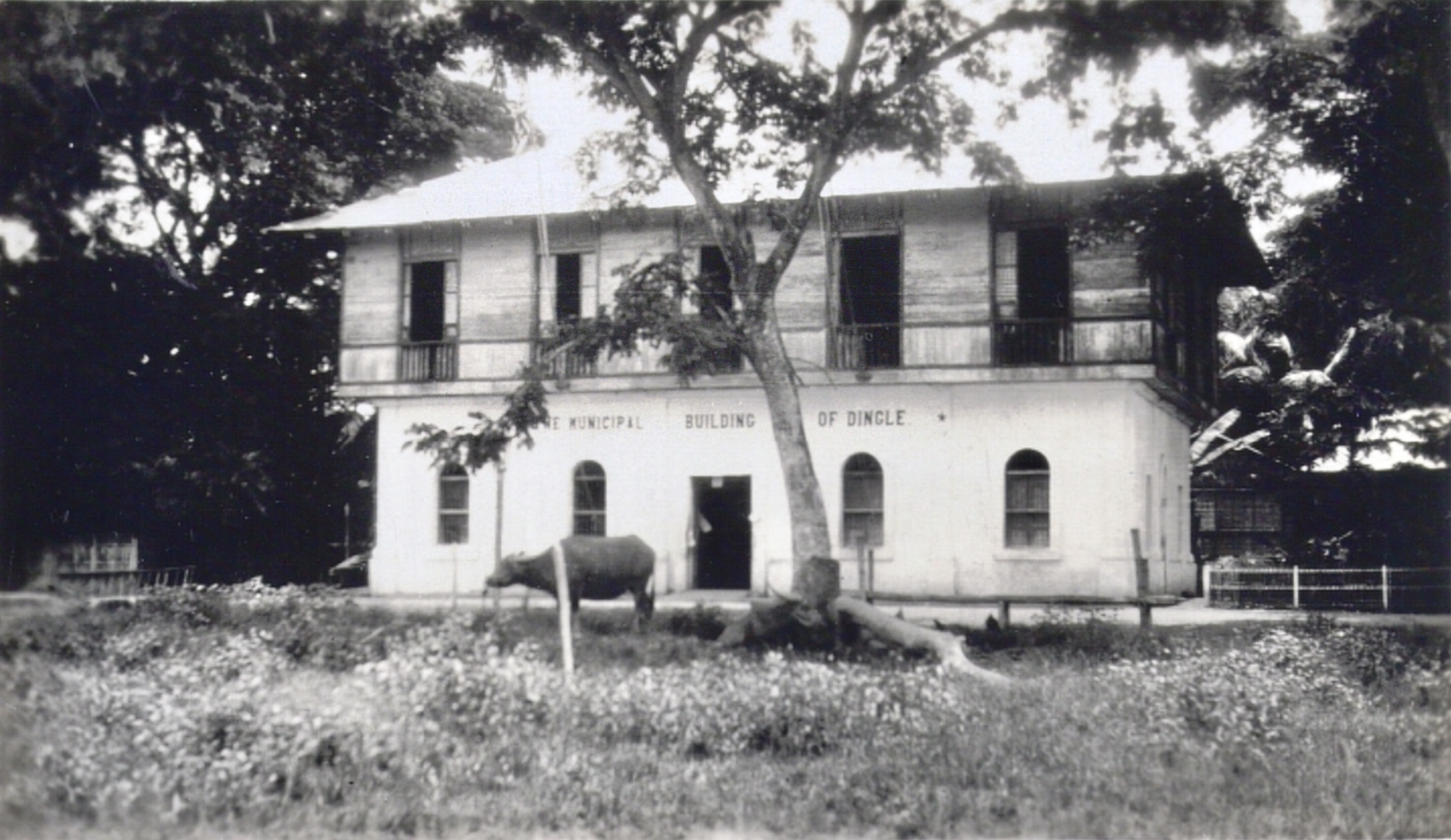
Dingle Town Hall in 1929

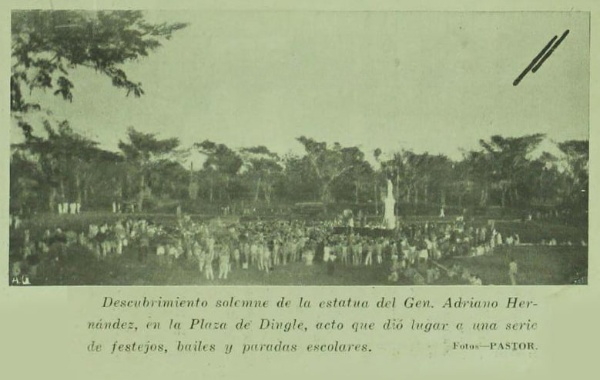
Inauguration of the bronze monument of Gen. Adriano Hernández y Dayot erected in 1931 in the town plaza of Dingle

In December 1900, a fire destroyed all the buildings in town save for the stone church. Following the assistance obtained by Don Maximiliano Dayot from the American government in Iloilo, the town was rebuilt, but the structures were of bamboo and nipa owing to the difficulty of obtaining lumber. In the same year, the town was recorded to have a population of 11,000.

In 1903, by virtue of Act No. 719, an Act reducing the fifty-one municipalities of the province of Iloilo to seventeen, Dingle, alongside the town of Mina, was annexed to Pototan under the Americans, the latter being larger in population and was economically more prosperous. Nonetheless, through the efforts of then Iloilo 4th District Assemblyman Adriano Hernández y Dayot, the separation of the town from Pototan was given impetus in 1907. Mina, however, would remain with Pototan until their eventual separation in 1968 by virtue of Republic Act No. 5442.

==== Education ====
The Americans believed that education is essential for self-rule so that they made this the keystone of their system of governance in the islands. The school house then was called the "tribunal." The first one was built on the site presently occupied by the municipal building. A Mr. Eastman, an American, was principal. However, the teachers employed were Dingleanons. Notable among them was José Muyco y Dayot.

During the administration of municipal president Don Tomás Sanico in 1912–1915, the construction of the Gabaldon school house was started and it remains to be the main edifice of the Dingle Elementary School complex. Funds were provided for by an appropriation bill sponsored by Nueva Ecija Assemblyman Isauro Gabaldón. The building was completed in 1917 during the second term of municipal president Don Vicente Dayot (1916–1919). The first superior to hold office in the new building was Juan Datiles and its first school principal was José Lagora. The first Dingleanon principal however was Paciano Dajay.

The cause of education was further served during the terms of office of municipal presidents Don Luís Dayot y Roces (1925–1928) and Don Julio Muyco y Dayot (1931–1934, 1938–1945), and municipal mayor Cristino Abelardo Muyco Aportadera (1934–1938). It was during the incumbency of Luís R. Dayot when the Jalandoni-Dayot Elementary School was established. Dayot also donated a school building to the Bureau of Public Schools. More primary schools were opened in the barrios during the terms of office of the last two mentioned municipal mayors.

==== Health ====
During his second term in office as municipal president (1919–1922), Julio Muyco y Dayot became responsible for the establishment of the first peuriculture center in Dingle which extended basic health services to the townspeople. The Centro de Peuriculture de Dingle was incorporated on November 6, 1922, with María D. Dayot as president.

Shortly after the establishment of American rule, the Philippine islands were afflicted by cholera and dysentery epidemics which caused the death of more than 200,000 people. Smallpox was likewise still unchecked by vaccination becoming a cause for considerable worry. During the administration of municipal president Don Cipriano J. Montero Sr. (1928–1931), the antipolo system of human waste disposal was imposed.

Water

In 1926, during the term of office of Luís R. Dayot as municipal president, the Iloilo Metropolitan Waterworks, created by virtue of Commonwealth Act No. 3222 dated September 16, 1926, constructed their waterworks system in Barrio Lincud. Its original pipelines are still in operation as of date, supplying water to Dingle and Pototan. Two natural springs, Lubong-Tubig and Talinab, serve as water sources.

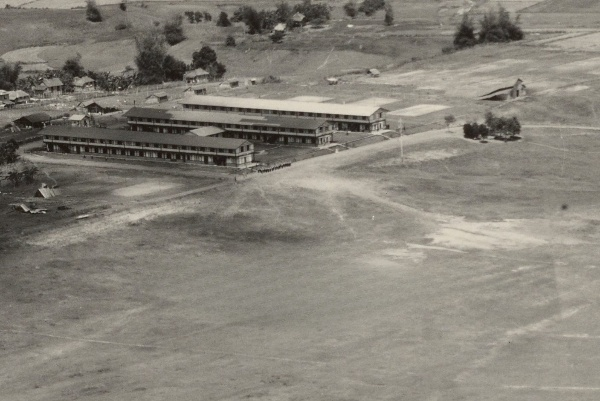
The initial seven-hectare grassland donation of then Dingle municipal president Luís R. Dayot to the Dingle Citizen Army Training Center in 1945, later the 37-hectare Philippine Army camp named in honor of Gen. Adriano Hernández y Dayot, established upon the request of Dingle municipal mayor Julio Muyco y Dayot

=== Japanese occupation ===
Immediately after the U.S. declaration of war on Japan on December 8, 1941, a squadron of Japanese planes flew over Dingle on its way to bomb Iloilo City. The townspeople went out of their houses into the streets and looked at the passing formation quite indifferent and unconcerned, unaware that war was going on. Only when a lone straggler, on its way from the bombing mission overflew the town at a very low altitude and directed bursts of machine gun fire against the citizen army training center, now Camp Adriano D. Hernandez, did the townspeople seek some sort of shelter.

Residents from the poblacion of Dingle left their homes and sought refuge in the town's far-flung barrios and mountainsides. They were joined by many others from Iloilo City and its adjoining towns, including Dingleanons who have been residing from other provinces. Among the more prominent who took shelter in Dingle were the families of post-war Iloilo governor Mariano Peñaflorida and post-war Iloilo 4th District Assemblyman Ceferino de los Santos of Pototan, and the brothers Eugenio and Fernando Lopez of Jaro, Iloilo. Peñaflorida stayed at Barrio Caguyuman at the foot of Mount Bulabog while the latter three sought refuge at Mount Dumingding. Thatched makeshift shelters and lean-tos blossomed overnight on the town's foothills and mountainsides. Many barrio residents shared their homes with the evacuees.

Iloilo Civil Resistance Government

In Iloilo, the civil resistance government, with headquarters at Barrio Moroboro, Dingle, was headed by Tomás Confesor as wartime governor of free Panay and Romblon with former Dingle municipal president Luís R. Dayot who, as assistant, helped finance the war effort in Panay. Former Dingle mayor Cristino Abelardo Muyco Aportadera was deputy governor.

In 1942, Julio Dayot Muyco and Numeriano Dayot Dator continued to act respectively as municipal mayor and vice-mayor of the Iloilo civil resistance government at Barrio Moroboro while lawyer José Dacudao was designated by the Japanese as puppet mayor and governed from the poblacion. Many Dingleanons were employed by the civil resistance government as clerks and aides, and as provincial guards. Dacudao felt the futility of his efforts in complying with unreasonable Japanese demands and in helping the Dingleanons against Japanese cruelties and atrocities that he left the puppet mayorship. His wife, Remedios Dacudao, assumed the post from 1943 to 1945. It was during her tenure as puppet mayor when 14 Dingleanons were executed by the Japanese. A passing Japanese patrol rounded up 14 able-bodied Dingleanons suspected of being guerillas and were later beheaded on Dayot Street, behind the town's Catholic church. Mayor Remedios Dacudao was, however, able to offer some measure of help by persuading the Japanese to leave without added civilian casualties.

Guerilla movement

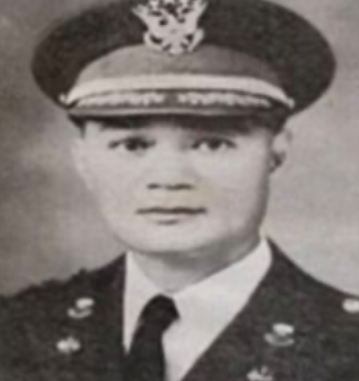
Gen. Vivencio D. Dayot

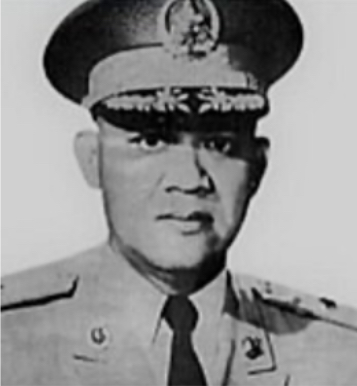
BGen. Alfredo D. Dayot

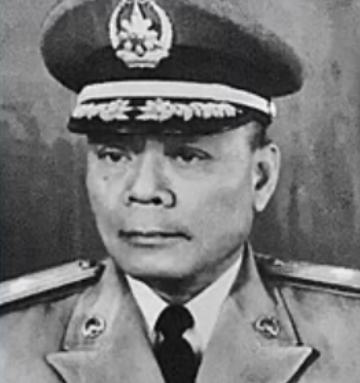
BGen. Noé D. Dayot

Dingleanon World War II guerillas and Bataan Death March survivors

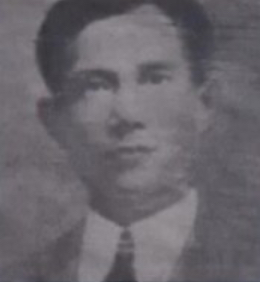
Don Vicente D. Dayot (1898, 1916–1919)

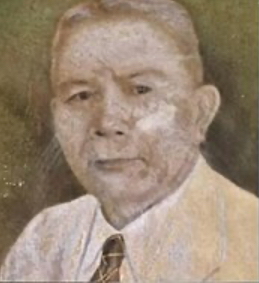
Don Julio Muyco y Dayot (1909–1910, 1919–1922, 1931–1934, 1938–1945)

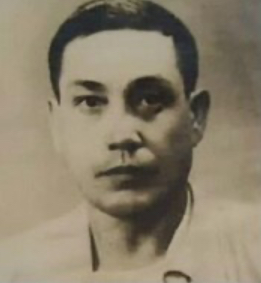
Don Luís R. Dayot (1925–1928)

Municipal presidents of Dingle during the American occupation

Among the Dingleanons who took a more active part in the military operations of the guerilla movement were Lt. Raymundo Muyco Espino and his elder brother, Lt. Alfonso Muyco Espino. Brig. Gen. Alfredo D. Dayot and Brig. Gen. Noé D. Dayot, survivors of the 1942 Bataan Death March, joined the former after they were released as prisoners of war in Capas, Tarlac. On the other hand, Gen. Vivencio D. Dayot, the first Filipino radar expert, was sent to the United States to avoid his capture by the Japanese forces as his contribution to the development of radar was vital to the needs of the Imperial Japanese Army. Others with similar notable exploits were Lt. Mateo Luto, Capt. Fulgencio Dairo, and Maj. Abelardo Muyco. These men, together with many other Dingleanons involved in the guerilla movement, took part in ambushes against enemy patrol and reconnaissance forces. These ambushes, however, often resulted in heightened enemy operations, then called "penetration" involving reprisal raids and search and destroy missions conducted against the civilian population.

Also in 1942, the guerillas burned all the houses and public buildings within the poblacion. Only the market place and the Catholic church were left practically undamaged. This they did while conducting some sort of scorched earth policy. The guerillas believed that with the houses and buildings gone, the Japanese would not set up a permanent garrison in the town.

=== Independence (1946–present) ===
Post-war rehabilitation

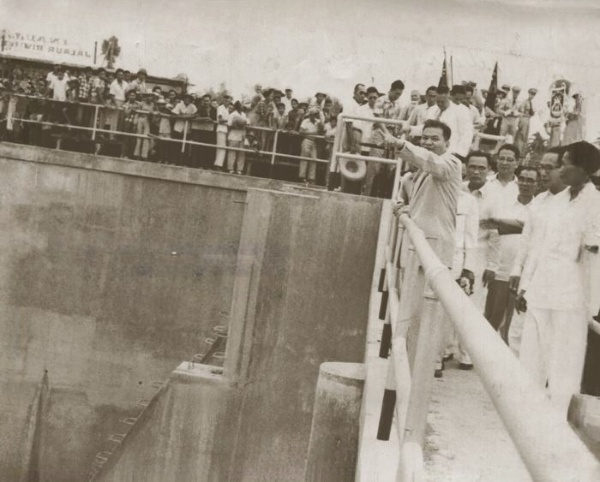
President Ramon Magsaysay with Iloilo governor Mariano B. Peñaflorida, Dingle mayor Alfonso Muyco Espino, and Dingle vice-mayor Maximiliano D. Dayot, during the inauguration of the Jalaur Diversion Irrigation Dam in Barrio Moroboro, Dingle, Iloilo in 1955

The war against Japan officially ended on September 2, 1945, with the signing of the term of formal surrender of the Japanese Imperial Government. The aftermath of the war found most of the poblacion in ruins. This, however, was the handiwork of the guerillas and not of the Japanese occupation forces.

The town made a rebound under the leadership of municipal mayor Julio Dayot Muyco, then serving a carry-over of his term. He initiated rehabilitation schemes for the municipality, with priorities extended to the peace and order situation, the re-establishment of classes, and the reconstruction of damaged roads and public buildings. The town's economy visibly improved. Market activities resumed in the poblacion's public market, first on Sundays, but later on through a consensus among the town's officials, on Saturdays.

It was also during this period when municipal mayor Julio Dayot Muyco worked out for the donation of a permanent site for the Dingle Citizen Army Training Center, an army training camp. Former Dingle municipal president Luís R. Dayot made the initial seven-hectare grassland donation for the said purpose. This site, now the Philippine Army Camp Adriano D. Hernandez, today serves as a training and mobilization center not only for the town and province of Iloilo, but also serves the country's citizen army training requirements.

Julián Masna was appointed municipal mayor in 1945 during the last days of the Commonwealth government under President Sergio Osmeña, and continued the reconstruction and rehabilitation work begun by Julio Dayot Muyco.

In 1947, Alfonso Muyco Espino was elected municipal mayor during the country's first post-war local elections. He ran as a Liberal against former puppet mayor Remedios Dacudao, a Nacionalista. During his administration, more municipal and barrio roads were constructed. The town plaza and the poblacion itself underwent major beautification changes. The swimming pool in Barrio Moroboro was deepened and widened. These improvements brought in more tourists, whose patronage generated some income for the municipality and for some enterprising small businesses that catered to their needs. In the same year, the Dingle Agricultural and Technical College (DATEC) and Dingle Junior High School were opened in Barrio San Matias.

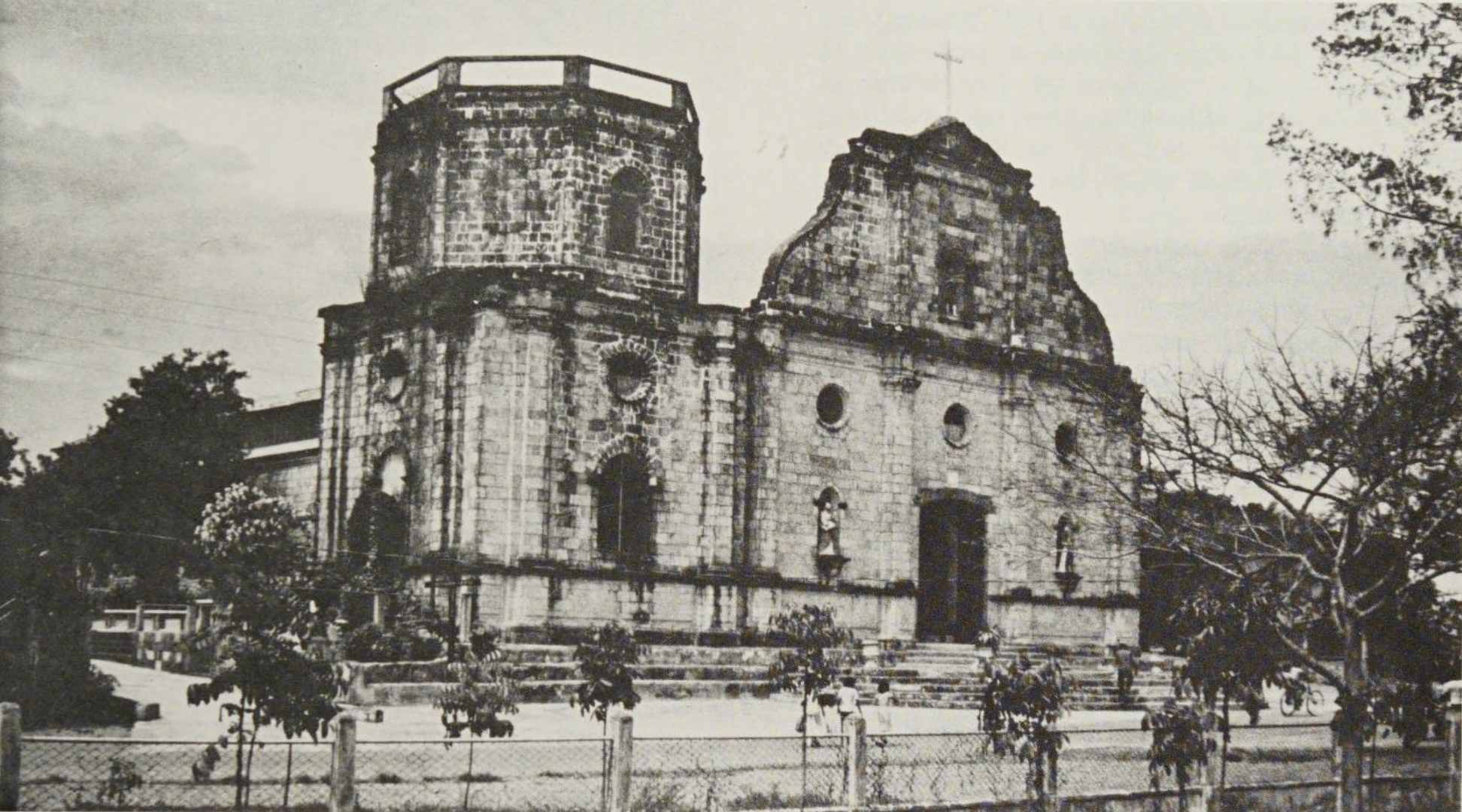
Dingle Church with its unfinished bell tower in 1987

In 1954, the sitio of Nazuni was converted into a barrio and was added as a barangay of Dingle.

In 1955, President Ramon Magsaysay personally inaugurated the Jalaur Diversion Irrigation Dam constructed at Barrio Moroboro during the administration of municipal mayor Alfonso Muyco Espino and vice-mayor Maximiliano D. Dayot for the benefit of about 11,0000 farmers and 14,000 hectares of farmland in the municipalities of Dingle, Zarraga, Pototan, Barotac Nuevo, Dumangas, Anilao, and Banate.

In 1955–1956, José J. Perono composed the hymn "Town of Dingle," the official municipal hymn of the Municipality of Dingle, officially adopted by the municipality during the incumbency of municipal mayor Robin Espino Solinap (2001–2006).

== Geography ==
The topography of Dingle is relatively rolling hills and narrow plains from the poblacion. The flat lands extend along the Jalaur River through its borderline to the southeast. This starts to roll upward from the poblacion going to the north-west. From the west of the poblacion rises the slopes, steep and mountainous. This indicates that the topography of Dingle meets a certain type-cropping pattern.

Dingle is 38 kilometres (24 mi) from Iloilo City.

=== Climate ===
Climate data for Dingle, Iloilo
Month	Jan	Feb	Mar	Apr	May	Jun	Jul	Aug	Sep	Oct	Nov	Dec	Year
Mean daily maximum °C (°F)	28 (82)	29 (84)	30 (86)	32 (90)	32 (90)	30 (86)	29 (84)	29 (84)	29 (84)	29 (84)	29 (84)	28 (82)	30 (85)
Mean daily minimum °C (°F)	23 (73)	22 (72)	23 (73)	23 (73)	25 (77)	25 (77)	24 (75)	24 (75)	24 (75)	24 (75)	23 (73)	23 (73)	24 (74)
Average precipitation mm (inches)	57 (2.2)	37 (1.5)	41 (1.6)	42 (1.7)	98 (3.9)	155 (6.1)	187 (7.4)	162 (6.4)	179 (7.0)	188 (7.4)	114 (4.5)	78 (3.1)	1,338 (52.8)
Average rainy days	12.0	7.7	9.2	10.2	19.5	24.6	26.9	25.1	25.5	25.2	18.0	13.0	216.9
Source: Meteoblue

=== Barangays ===
Dingle is politically subdivided into 33 barangays. Each barangay consists of puroks and some have sitios.

- Abangay
- Agsalanan
- Agtatacay
- Alegria
- Bongloy
- Buenavista
- Caguyuman
- Calicuang
- Camambugan
- Dawis
- Ginalinan Nuevo
- Ginalinan Viejo
- Gutao
- Ilajas
- Libo-o
- Licu-an
- Lincud
- Matangharon
- Moroboro
- Namatay
- Nazuni
- Pandan
- Poblacion
- Potolan
- San Jose
- San Matias
- Siniba-an
- Tabugon
- Tambunac
- Tanghawan
- Tiguib
- Tinocuan
- Tulatula-an

== Demographics ==
Population census of Dingle
Year	Pop.	±% p.a.
1903	12,129	—
1918	13,333	+0.63%
1939	16,698	+1.08%
1948	18,475	+1.13%
1960	19,748	+0.56%
1970	23,375	+1.70%
1975	26,368	+2.45%
1980	29,179	+2.05%
1990	35,415	+1.96%
1995	35,639	+0.12%
2000	38,311	+1.56%
2007	40,828	+0.88%
2010	43,290	+2.15%
2015	45,335	+0.88%
2020	45,965	+0.29%
2024	46,032	+0.03%
Source: Philippine Statistics Authority

In the 2024 census, the population of Dingle was 46,032 people, with a density of 470 inhabitants per square kilometre or 1,200 inhabitants per square mile.

== Economy ==
Poverty incidence of Dingle (%)

Source: Philippine Statistics Authority

== Education ==
The Dingle Schools District Office governs all educational institutions within the municipality. It oversees the management and operations of all private and public, from primary to secondary schools.

=== Primary and elementary schools ===
- Abangay Elementary School
- Agsalanan Elementary School
- Agustin Muyco Elementary School (Lincud Elementary School)
- Agtatacay-Gutao Elementary School (Agtatacay Elementary School)
- Alegria Elementary School
- Bongloy Elementary School
- Calicuang Elementary School
- Camambugan Elementary School
- Dingle Central Elementary School
- Dingle Family Farm School
- Goodnews Learning Center
- Ilajas Elementary School
- Isabel Roces Memorial Elementary School
- Libo-o Elementary School
- Matangharon Elementary School
- Mater Carmeli School
- Moroboro Elementary School
- Muyco-Daguro Elementary School (Caguyuman Elementary School)
- Nazuni Elementary School
- Potolan Elementary School
- San Jose Elementary School
- San Matias Elementary School (Licu-an Elementary School)
- Siniba-an Elementary School
- Sra. Consolacion Muyco Aportadera Memorial Elementary School
- Tabugon Elementary School
- Tinocuan Elementary School
- White Elementary School

=== Secondary schools ===
- Calicuang National High School
- Dingle National High School
- Rufino G. Palabrica Sr. National High School
- Tabugon National High School
- Nazuni Summit Comprehensive National High School

=== Higher educational institution ===
- Iloilo State University of Fisheries Science and Technology (Dingle Campus)

== Infrastructure ==
=== Power ===
The Panay Diesel Power Plant located at Tinocuan and Tabugon, Dingle provides 110 megawatts of electricity to Panay. The power plant is operated by the National Power Corporation.

=== Water ===
Two natural springs, Lubong-Tubig and Talinab, serve as the water source for the Dingle-Pototan Water District. While the Jalaur Diversion Irrigation Dam built in 1955, also known as Moroboro Dam, provides irrigation to the agricultural lands of Dingle and nearby towns.

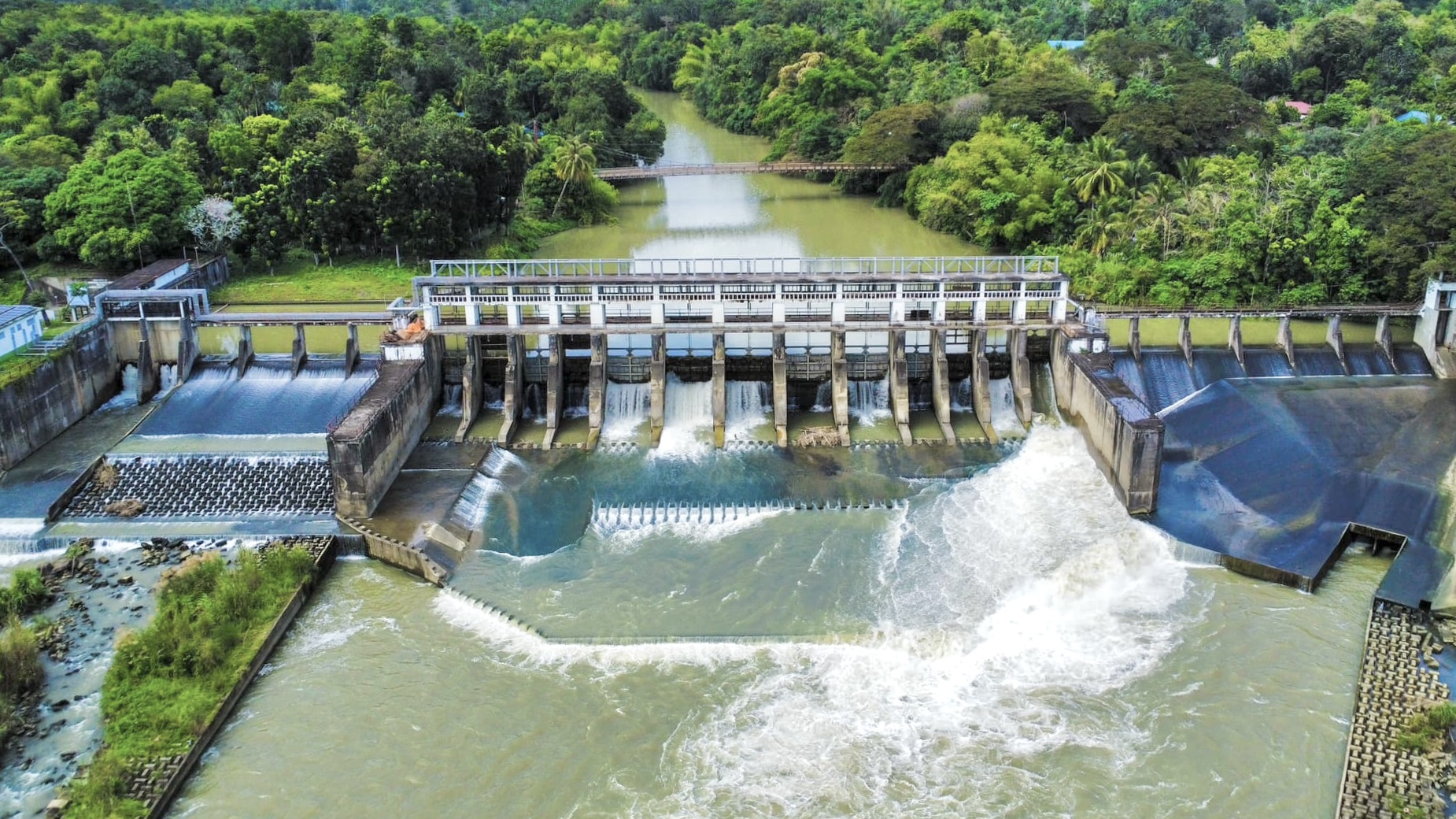
Aerial view of the Jalaur Diversion Irrigation Dam in Moroboro, Dingle in the foreground constructed during the administration of Dingle mayor Alfonso Muyco Espino and vice-mayor Maximiliano D. Dayot, with the post-WWII Moroboro Suspension Bridge in the background

== Landmarks ==
=== Bulabog Putian National Park ===
Bulabog Putian is the only limestone rock formation on Panay. It was designated a National Park through Congressional Bill No. 1651, and such is considered a "nationally significant area." It occupies a land area of 834.033 hectares covering five of the 33 barangays of Dingle. The park contains 13 known caves namely: Lungib, Hapu-Hapo, Maarhong, Guizo, Maestranza, Linganero, Lapuz Lapuz, Ticondal, Butac, Tuco, San Roque, Pitong Liko, and Nautod. The Maestranza Cave is historically important as it served as a hide-out of the revolutionary forces during the Spanish colonial period and on its stone walls bear the inscriptions of the revolutionary troops.

=== Mt. Manyakiya ===
Mount Manyakiya is a natural viewing deck that provides a panoramic view of Negros Island as well as the low lying towns of the province of Iloilo. Nautod Wall, one of the major rock-climbing destination in the Philippines, can be found here.

=== Water ===
- Lake Bito
- Jalaur River
- Lubong-Tubig Spring
- Talinab Spring

=== Historical ===
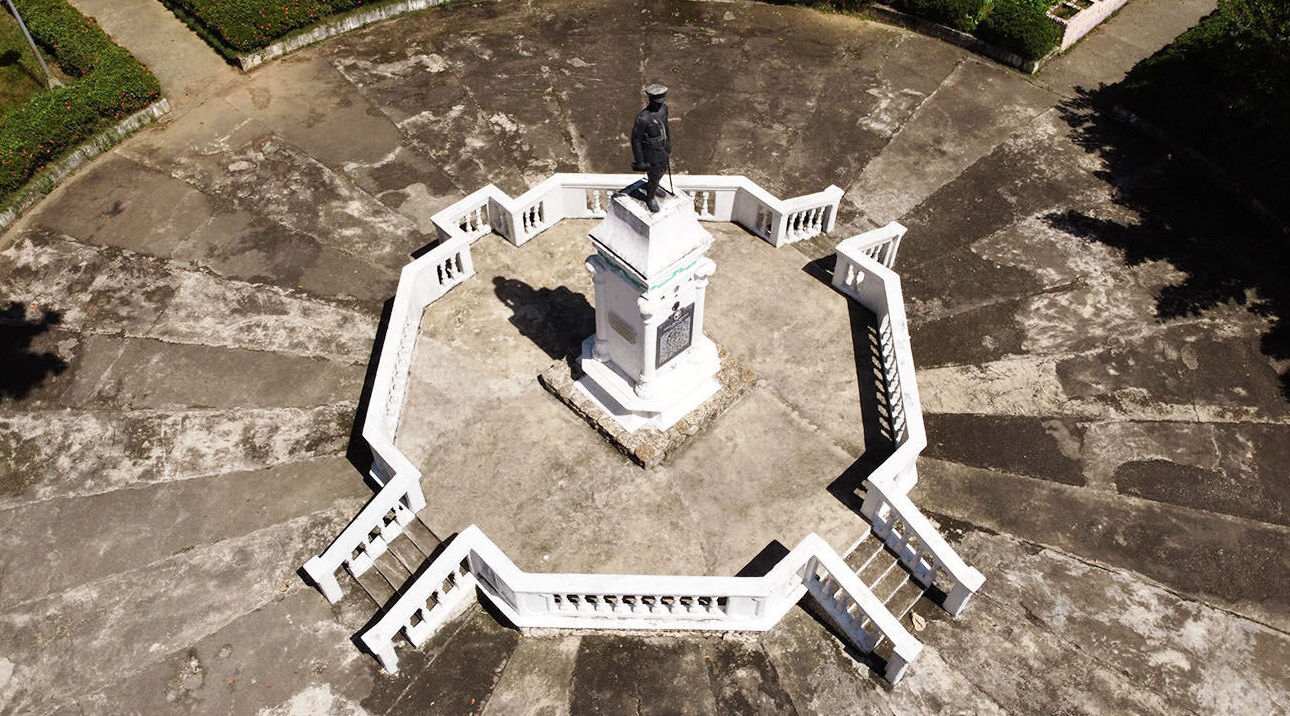

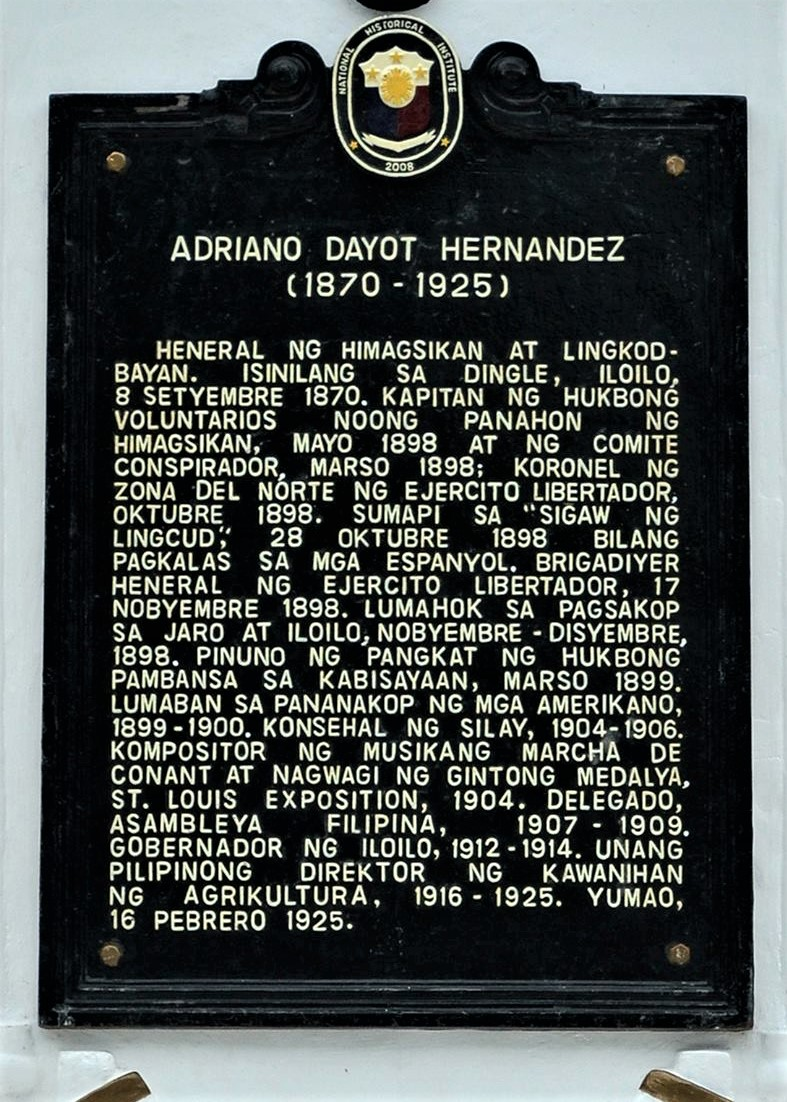
National Historical Commission of the Philippines

National Historical Commission of the Philippines marker installed in 2008 for the bronze monument of Gen. Adriano Hernández y Dayot in the Dingle town plaza
- Memorial to the Cry of Lincud Heroes
- Adriano Dayot Hernández bronze monument
- Dingle Parish Church – Finished in 1886, this church, a fine example of Filipino baroque adaptation, is made of limestones from Bulabog Mountain, painstakingly carried by the early parishioners through narrow, steep, and dangerous trails to the present site.

=== Other landmarks ===
- The Moroboro Suspension Bridge is a ruined post-WWII bridge that traverses the Jalaur River.
- Camp Pasica is a 13-hectare Girl Scout Camp.
- Camp Adriano D. Hernandez is a 37-hectare military training camp of the Philippine Army named in honor of the revolutionary hero, Gen. Adriano Hernández y Dayot.
- Jalaur Diversion Irrigation Dam
- Museo de Dingle
- Welcome Sign

== Culture ==
=== Festivals ===
The Dingle Town Fiesta is celebrated every 24th day of June in honor of its patron saint, John the Baptist. The Pagdihon Festival is a celebration in commemoration of the Cry of Lincud, the first revolt against the Spaniards in Panay. It is held every 4th week of October.

Parish Priests of the Parish of St. John the Baptist of Dingle

1. Pedro del Castillo, OSA (1611–1614)
2. Diego de Oseguera, OSA (1614–1615)
3. Antonio Porras, OSA (1615–1617)
4. Fernando Alvarado, OSA (1617)
5. Juan Yáñez y Morales, OSA (1617–1620)
6. Francisco Oliva, OSA (1620–1623)
7. Pedro Ramírez, OSA (1623–1629)
8. Vicente Suárez, OSA (1629–1632)
9. Tomás de Villanueva, OSA (1632–1633)
10. Pedro del Castillo, OSA (1633–1635)
11. Tomás de Morales, OSA (1635–1638)
12. Juan Ponce, OSA (1653–1684)
13. Francisco de Mesa, OSA (1659–1663)
14. Alejandro Rey, OSA (1669–?)
15. Ildefonso de Escos, OSA (1669–1671)
16. Manuel López, OSA (1683–1684)
17. Andrés Alonso Martín, OSA (1693–1695)
18. Pedro de Vera, OSA (1695–1699)
19. José Zamora, OSA (1701–1704)
20. Agustín Barzán, OSA (1710–1713)
21. Andrés Alonso Martín, OSA (1713– 1716)
22. Agustín Barzán, OSA (1716)
23. Domingo de la Concepcíon, OSA (1720–1722)
24. Fernando Camporredondo, OSA (1737–1740)
25. Juan Sánchez, OSA (1753–1759)
26. Pedro Maza, OSA (1788–1790)
27. Juan Frayle, OSA (1796–1812)
28. Juan Frayle, OSA (1829–1838)
29. Benito González, OSA (1845– 1849)
30. Julián Núñez, OSA (1851–1855)
31. Manuel Portal, OSA (1855–1865)
32. Fernando Llorente y Santos, OSA (1865–1874)
33. José Lobo, OSA (1874–1876)
34. Melquíades Arizmendi y LLorente, OSA (1876–1877)
35. Rafael Murillo, OSA (1877–1893)
36. Agapito Lope, OSA (1893)
37. Quintín Isar, OSA (1893–1897)
38. Nicolás Puras, OSA (1897–1898)
39. Ciriaco Pendón (1899–1910)
40. Felix Gedican (1910–1937)
41. Vicente Gonzales (1937–1939)
42. César Sandoval (1940–1946)
43. José Buenaflor (1947–1953)
44. Diosdado Parreñas (1953–1956)
45. Eligio Villavert (1956–1965)
46. Ismael Castaño (1965–1968)
47. Manuel Garin (1968–1975)
48. Nemesio Espinosa (1975)
49. Victor Casa (1975–1979)
50. Eriberto Daniel (1979–?)

Fiesta Queens of Dingle

1. Editha Osano (1946)
2. Muse of the Night (1947)
3. Editha Osano (1948)
4. Lourdes Cadiz, Carnival (1949)
5. Araceli Daquiado (1950)
6. Nelida H. Osano (1951)
7. Muse of the Night (1952)
8. Norma Tumbucon (1953)
9. Consejo Porras (1954)
10. Leonisa Dana, Carnival (1955)
11. Editha P. Osano (1956)
12. Zenaida B. Abang, Carnival (1957)
13. Evelyn Denoman (1958)
14. Ethel P. Sontillanosa (1959)
15. Thelma S. Kilayko (1960)
16. Renee Espino (1961)
17. Angelita Lazarito (1962)
18. Glenda Gloria (1963)
19. Emilia Lee Ang (1964)
20. Josephine C. Go (1965)
21. Catherine Torres (1966)
22. Czarina C. Abang (1967)
23. Violeta Pradilla (1968)
24. Ma. Teresa Gayoso (1969)
25. Muse of the Night (1970)
26. Muse of the Night (1971)
27. Muse of the Night (1983)
28. Mylene L. Palabrica (1984)
29. Genalyn P. Magbanua (1985)
30. Cherry G. Layson (1986)
31. Ma. Corazon O. Aportadera (1987)
32. Ma. Veronica M. Guazo (1988)
33. Girlie Parania (1989)
34. Wendy C. Datorin (1990)
35. Anne Cecil P. Quilaton (1991)
36. Sheryl Ann Distua (1992)
37. Ann Rapunzel O. Ganzon (1993)

Cuisine

Dulce de Dingle (papaya rosette), exclusively from Dingle, is a traditional candy from the 1940s made from papaya and yema (egg-based custard). The sweets is made by shaving thin strips of green papaya, cooking them in sugar, and shaping them by hand into small flowers with a stick of sweet yema as forming as its stem.

== Government ==
=== Municipal officials ===
The elected municipal officials of the local government unit of Dingle, Iloilo for 2022–2025.

Local Government Unit of Dingle
Representative
Ferjenel G. Biron (NP)	
Mayor
Rufino P. Palabrica III (NP)	
Vice Mayor
Quindialem Deaño-Villanueva (NUP)	
Sangguniang Bayan Members
Thalea Julina P. Memoracion-Wong (NP)	Edwin L. Cabayao (NP)
Rufino C. Sorianosos (Independent)	Rhenan Val D. Ariola (PDPLBN)
Jimmy C. Quicoy (NP)	Marilyn M. Solinap (NP)
Mia Marie L. Pasquin (NP)	Jessie M. Alecto (NP)
ABC President
Rollie Pelarin
SK Federation President
Raymund C. Domopoy

=== List of heads of government ===
Principalía clans of Dingle

The principalía, the distinguished upper class and hispanized Christian descendants of the pre-colonial datus, included only those exempted from tribute (tax) to the Spanish crown. Colonial documents would refer to them as "de privilegio y gratis", in contrast to those who pay tribute ("de pago"). This social class inherited their vast estates from their pre-Spanish ancestors and only its members were allowed to vote and be elected to public office. The principalía represented the wealthiest, the most educated, and upwardly mobile segment of colonial society, and were ranked just below Spanish officials themselves. It was the true aristocracy and nobility of the Spanish-colonial Philippines.

The honorific don and doña and was reserved to the principalía, whose right to rule was recognized by Philip II on June 11, 1594.

The five most prominent clans that formed part of the principalía dingleña were the Daraug, Dator, Dayot, Muyco, and Osano clans—all five share the same root and have intermarried with one another, as was the practice of the datu class before the Spanish colonial-era.

==== Gobernadorcillos and curas párrocos ====
The gobernadorcillo was elected from among the ranks of the principalía by twelve senior cabezas de barangay, the latter being the Spanish-era equivalent of the pre-colonial datu (i.e., lord).

In 1823, Don Julio Dator became the first gobernadorcillo of the pueblo of Dingle in almost two centuries upon its re-elevation as a pueblo after five years under Dumangas and 182 years under Laglag. Don Juan Marcelino Dayot, founder of the pueblo of Dingle, commenced with the construction of the town's current stone church and served as gobernadorcillo for six years from 1829 to 1835. Until 1850, however, Dingle was still under the parish of Laglag. Of note, the brothers-in-law Don Magdaleno Muyco (Tan Mano), who was married to Doña Nicolasa Dayot (Tana Kulasa), and Don Luís Cantalicio Dayot (Tan Cantaling), the longest-serving gobernadorcillo of the pueblo, sold a number of their vast landholdings to pay for the tributes of their constituents during their years in office as gobernadorcillos.

However, it was the friar curates who truly governed the pueblos, not only in matters connected with their ministry, but in every path of life, without excepting private life; for although there existed in each pueblo an administrative authority assisted by a board known by the name of "Común de principales" (council of the principal men of the village), all authorities, with very rare exceptions, were completely under the dominion of the former, for they were absolutely satisfied that any opposition to the slightest desire of the curate would sooner or later bring upon them serious trouble.

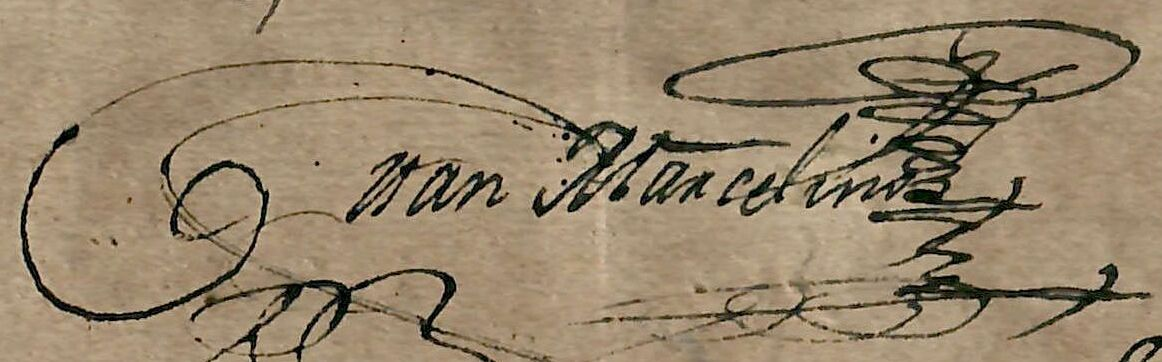
Signature of Don Juan Marcelino Dayot, Dingleño teniente mayor (deputy gobernadorcillo) of Laglag and later gobernadorcillo of Dingle (1829–1835), instrumental for the re-establishment of Dingle as a pueblo after 187 years as a visita under Dumangas and Laglag

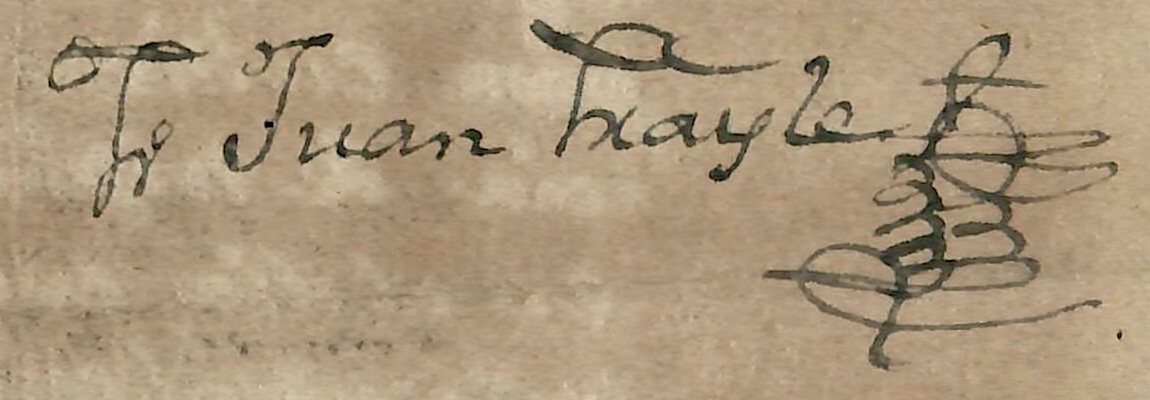
Signature of Fray Juan Frayle, OSA — cura párroco of the Parish of St. Jerome of Laglag, Iloilo, and its annex, Dingle (1829–1849), and builder of the current foundation of Dingle Church — from the page containing his certification concerning the elevation of the visita of Dingle into a pueblo

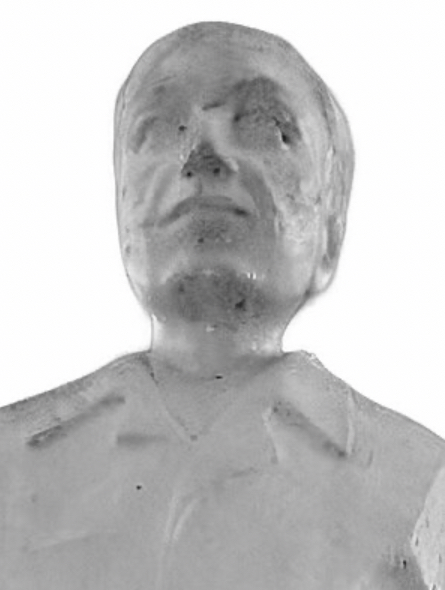
Don Luís Cantalicio Dayot y del Rosario, the longest-serving gobernadorcillo of Dingle (1853–1861, 1869–1873)

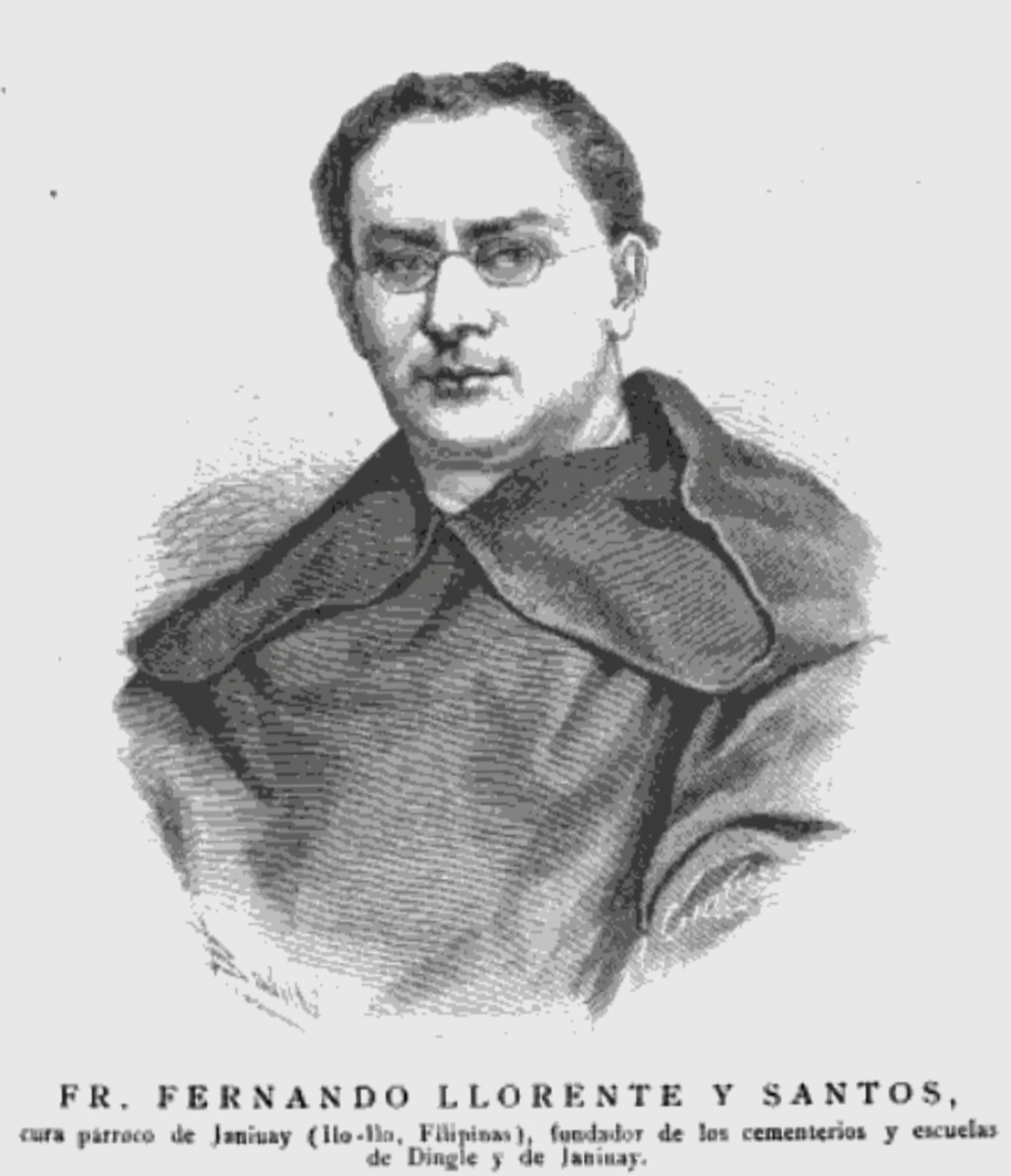
Fray Fernando Llorente y Santos, OSA, cura párroco of the Parish of St. John the Baptist of Dingle, Iloilo (1865–1874), and builder of the current structure of Dingle Church

Order	Gobernadorcillo	Years in Office	Cura párroco
1	Julio Dator	1823–1827	Juan Frayle, OSA; Parish Priest of Laglag (1796–1812, 1819–1829); Parish Priest of Laglag for the annex of Dingle (1829–1838)
2	Buenaventura Osano	1827–1829	Juan Frayle, OSA; Parish Priest of Laglag (1796–1812, 1819–1829); Parish Priest of Laglag for the annex of Dingle (1829–1838)
3	Juan Marcelino Dayot	1829–1835	Juan Frayle, OSA; Parish Priest of Laglag (1796–1812, 1819–1829); Parish Priest of Laglag for the annex of Dingle (1829–1838)
4	Magdaleno Muyco	1835–1838	Juan Frayle, OSA; Parish Priest of Laglag (1796–1812, 1819–1829); Parish Priest of Laglag for the annex of Dingle (1829–1838)
4	Magdaleno Muyco	1839–1843	Benito González, OSA; Parish priest of Laglag (1839–1845); Parish priest of Laglag for the annex of Dingle (1845–1849)
5	Buenaventura Osano	1843–1845	Benito González, OSA; Parish priest of Laglag (1839–1845); Parish priest of Laglag for the annex of Dingle (1845–1849)
6	Alejandro Daráug	1845–1849	Benito González, OSA; Parish priest of Laglag (1839–1845); Parish priest of Laglag for the annex of Dingle (1845–1849)
6	Alejandro Daráug	1849–1851	
7	Magdaleno Muyco	1851–1853	Julián Núñez, OSA; Parish Priest of Dingle (1851–1855)
8	Luís Cantalicio Dayot	1853–1855	Julián Núñez, OSA; Parish Priest of Dingle (1851–1855)
8	Luís Cantalicio Dayot	1855–1861	Manuel Portal, OSA; Parish Priest of Dingle (1855–1865)
8	Luís Cantalicio Dayot	1861–1863	Manuel Portal, OSA; Parish Priest of Dingle (1855–1865)
9	Alejandro Daráug	1861–1863	Manuel Portal, OSA; Parish Priest of Dingle (1855–1865)

The distinction of being part of the principalía was originally a hereditary right, as no amount of wealth could change one's class. However, a royal decree dated December 20, 1863 (signed in the name of Queen Isabella II by the Minister of the Colonies, José de la Concha) extended the distinction as principales to citizens paying 50 pesos in land tax. It made possible the creation of new principales under certain defined criteria, among which was proficiency in the Castilian language.

The first in the pueblo to benefit from this royal decree was Don Santiago Sanico who was first elected as gobernadorcillo in 1873.

Order	Gobernadorcillo	Years in Office	Cura párroco
	Alejandro Daráug	1863–1865	Manuel Portal, OSA; Parish Priest of Dingle (1855–1865)
10	Domingo Osano	1865–1869	Fernando Llorente y Santos, OSA; Parish Priest of Dingle (1865–1874)
11	Luís Cantalicio Dayot	1869–1873	Fernando Llorente y Santos, OSA; Parish Priest of Dingle (1865–1874)
12	Santiago Sanico	1873–1874	Fernando Llorente y Santos, OSA; Parish Priest of Dingle (1865–1874)
12	Santiago Sanico	1874–1876	José Lobo, OSA; Parish Priest of Dingle (1874–1876)
12	Santiago Sanico	1876–1877	Melquíades Arizmendi y Llorente, OSA; Parish Priest of Dingle (1876–1877)
12	Santiago Sanico	1877–1879	Rafael Murillo, OSA; Parish Priest of Dingle (1877–1893)
13	Tomás Sanico	1879–1885	Rafael Murillo, OSA; Parish Priest of Dingle (1877–1893)
14	Santiago Sanico	1885–1887	Rafael Murillo, OSA; Parish Priest of Dingle (1877–1893)
15	Julián Dalipe	1887–1893	Rafael Murillo, OSA; Parish Priest of Dingle (1877–1893)
15	Julián Dalipe	1893	Agapito Lope, OSA; Parish Priest of Dingle (1893)
15	Julián Dalipe	1893	Quintín Isar, OSA; Parish Priest of Dingle (1893–1897)

==== Capitán municipal ====
In 1893, the Maura Law was passed to reorganize town governments with the aim of making them more effective and autonomous. The law changed the title of chief executive of the town from gobernadorcillo to capitán municipal.

Order	Capitán municipal	Years in Office	Cura párroco
16	Gabriel Sinoy	1894–1897	Quintín Isar, OSA; Parish Priest of Dingle (1893–1897)
16	Gabriel Sinoy	1894–1897	Nicolás Puras, OSA; Parish Priest of Dingle (1897–1898)

==== Revolution presidents (1898–1900) ====
During the initial phase of the Philippine revolution in Panay organized by Gen. Adriano Hernández y Dayot, Don Vicente Dayot, son of juez de paz (justice of the peace) Don Maximiliano Dayot y del Rosario, served his first term as town head at the age of 9 during the absence of capitán municipal Don Gabriel Sinoy.

Order	Presidente local	Years in office	Cura párroco
17	Vicente Dayot	1898	Nicolás Puras, OSA; Parish Priest of Dingle (1897–1898)
18	Gabriel Sinoy	1898	Nicolás Puras, OSA; Parish Priest of Dingle (1897–1898)
18	Gabriel Sinoy	1899–1900	Ciriaco Pendón; Parish Priest of Dingle (1899–1910)

==== Early American Period Presidents ====
Order	Municipal President	Years in Office
	Gabriel Sinoy	1900–1902
19	Nicolás Roces	1902–1904

==== Capitán del barrio ====
Dingle was reduced to the status of barrio from 1904 to 1907 after it was merged with the Municipality of Pototan, alongside Mina, by virtue of Act No. 719, an Act reducing the fifty-one municipalities of the province of Iloilo to seventeen. During this interlude, the heads of government for Dingle were Pototan municipal presidents Don Rafael Parcon (1904–1906) and Don Magdaleno Silva (1906–1907).

Order	Capitán del barrio (of Dingle)	Years in Office	Municipal President (of Pototan)
	Nicolás Roces	1904–1907	Rafael Parcon (1904–1906)
	Nicolás Roces	1904–1907	Magdaleno Silva (1906–1907)

==== Presidentes & vice presidentes municipal ====
Dingle was re-established as a municipality in 1907 after Iloilo 4th District Assemblyman Adriano Hernández y Dayot succeeded in persuading Governor-General James Francis Smith to issue an executive order separating Dingle from Pototan.

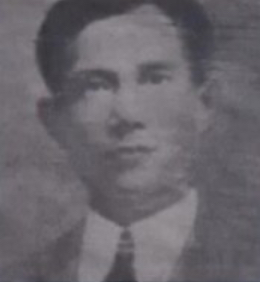
Don Vicente D. Dayot (1898, 1916–1919)

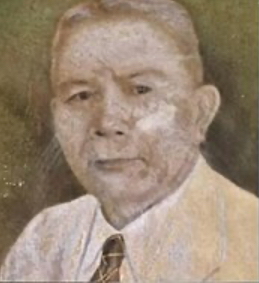
Don Julio Muyco y Dayot (1909–1910, 1919–1922, 1931–1934, 1938–1945)

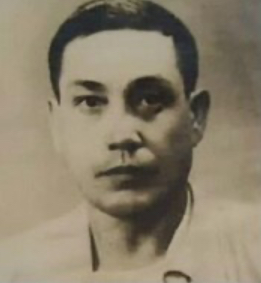
Don Luís R. Dayot (1925–1928)

Municipal presidents of Dingle during the American occupation

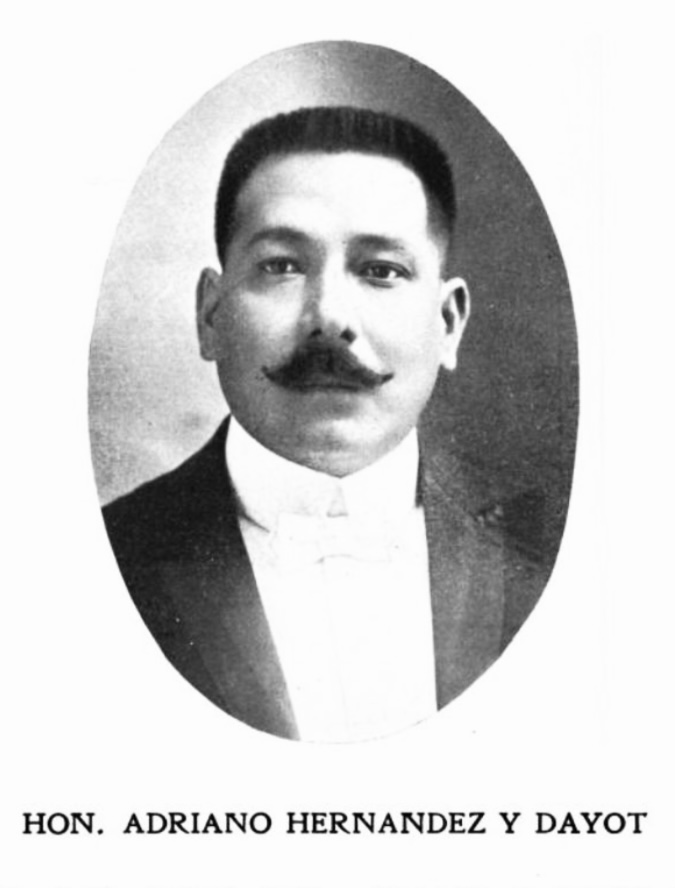
Iloilo 4th District Assemblyman Adriano Hernández y Dayot (1907–1909), later Iloilo Governor (1912–1914), and the first Filipino Assistant Director (1914–1916) and Director of Agriculture (1916–1925) — instrumental for the separation of Dingle from Pototan and Mina in 1907 following Act No. 719 of 1904 merging the three as one municipality under Pototan.

Order	Municipal President	Years in Office	Order	Municipal Vice-president	Years in Office
20	Julián Dalipe	1907–1908			
21	Juan Cancio Dacudao	1908–1909	1	Julio Dayot Muyco	1908–1909
22	Julio Dayot Muyco	1909–1910			
23	Tomás Sanico	1910–1916	2	Celestino Dañocup	1910–1913
23	Tomás Sanico	1910–1916	3	Julián Masna	1913–1916
24	Vicente Dayot	1916–1919	3	Julián Masna	1916–1919
25	Julio Dayot Muyco	1919–1922	4	Manuel Roces	1919–1925
26	Tomás Sanico	1922–1925	4	Manuel Roces	1919–1925
27	Luís Roces Dayot	1925–1928	5	Celestino Dañocup	1925–1928
28	Cipriano Montero Sr.	1928–1931	6	Simplicio Dabalus	1928–1931
29	Julio Dayot Muyco	1931–1934	7	Numeriano Dayot Dator	1931–1934

==== Municipal Mayors ====
Order	Mayor	Years in Office	Order	Vice-mayor	Years in Office
30	Cristino Abelardo Muyco Aportadera	1934–1938	8	Vicente Muyco	1934–1938
31	Julio Dayot Muyco	1938–1942	9	Numeriano Dayot Dator	1938–1942
	Julio Dayot Muyco; Civil Resistance Government	1942–1945		Numeriano Dayot Dator; Civil Resistance Government	1942–1945
	José Dacudao; Japanese Puppet Mayor	1942			
	Remedios Dacudao; Japanese Puppet Mayor	1943–1945			
32	Julián Masna	1945–1948	10	Salvador Dayot Dator	1945–1948
33	Alfonso Muyco Espino	1948–1957	11	Cipriano Montero Sr.	1948–1951
33	Alfonso Muyco Espino	1948–1957	12	Maximiliano Dalipe Dayot	1951–1957
34	Felipe Defensor (appointed)	1957	13	Leonardo Muyco Aportadera	1957
35	Leonardo Muyco Aportadera	1959–1963	14	Maximino Muyco	1959–1963
36	Rufino Aportadera Palabrica Jr.	1964–1967	15	Felipe Potente	1964–1967
37	Roberto Aportadera Palabrica Sr.	1968–1986	16	Cipriano Dayot Montero Jr.	1968–1971
37	Roberto Aportadera Palabrica Sr.	1968–1986	17	Teodoro Luntao Jr.	1971–1986
38	José Aportadera; OIC Mayor	1986–1988	18	Remegio Confesor Sr. OIC Vice-mayor	1986–1988
39	Teodoro Luntao Jr.	1988–1992	19	Robin Espino Solinap	1988–1992
40	Henry Anotado	1992–2001	20	Jessie Alecto	1992–2001
41	Robin Espino Solinap	2001–2006	21	Reblun Luntao-Lacson	2001–2006
42	Reblun Luntao-Lacson	2006-2007	22	Quindialem Deaño-Villanueva	2006-2007
43	Rufino Palabrica III	2007–2016	23	Reblun Luntao-Lacson	2007–2010
43	Rufino Palabrica III	2007–2016	24	Jessie Alecto	2010-2016
44	Jessie Alecto	2016–2018	25	Rufino Palabrica III	2016–2018
45	Rufino Palabrica III	2018–present	26	Jimmy Quicoy	2018–2019
45	Rufino Palabrica III	2018–present	27	Quindialem Deaño-Villanueva	2019–present

== Notable personalities ==
- General Adriano Hernández y Dayot – Revolutionary hero
- Guillermo Gómez Rivera – Filipino writer, journalist, poet, playwright, historian, linguist
- Merlie Muyco Alunan – Palanca Awardee for Literature
- Nancy Deaño – Olympic competitor
- Most Rev. Jose S. Palma, D.D., S.Th.D – Archbishop-Emeritus of Cebu and former president of the Catholic Bishops' Conference of the Philippines
