= Lapuz Lapuz Cave =

Cave and archaeological site in Iloilo, Philippines

- location in the Philippines
- 11°1′40.6″N 122°39′22″E
- Location: Bulabog Putian National Park in Moroboro, Dingle, Iloilo, Philippines
- Region: Western Visayas

Lapuz Lapuz Cave is a cave in Bulabog Putian National Park in Moroboro, Dingle, Iloilo in the Philippines. It is 90 m (295.3 ft) long. The limestone area at its south end is adjacent to Jalaur River, while the north side is adjacent to the Tambunac River.

== Archaeological finds ==
=== Stratigraphy ===
A small test conducted by Coutts, Wesson, and Santiago, in Lapuz Lapuz cave in 1977 contained large numbers of stone tools, shells, bones, and some pottery. In 1978, Coutts returned to conduct a full excavation of the cave

In an auger survey conducted by two geologists, Dr. Robert Watson and Ms. Rosalind Cochrane, they discovered that the floor sediments were over 5 m (16 ft) deep. Although many layers were discovered, only two are in situ; Layer 1 is heavily disturbed. Radiocarbon dates were given using charcoal present in Layers 2 and 3. Layer 2 is dated at 760 ± 100 years BP, while Layer 3 is dated 580 ± 200 years BP. These dates are within one standard deviation apart, and hence are considered to be contemporaneous layers.

=== Animal remains ===
Peaks in shell concentrations in the cave suggests that different sections of the floor were used shell dumps. Twenty-one species of molluscs that was recovered include genera such as Rhysota, Helicostyla, Cyclophorus, Obba, and Thiara. Of the five specified genera, only Thiara lives in a freshwater environment. The other molluscs dwell in the forest surrounding Lapuz Lapuz cave.

More than 77,000 animals bones were recovered and 30% of these were identified to taxon. All layers contained remains of bat, deer, pig, rat, monkey, civet, lizard, snake, bird, turtle, fish, crab and frog remains.

=== Earthenware ===
1,815 earthenware pot sherds were recovered from the excavation. Most of them were undisturbed, but some have developed cracks and encrustations due to calcium carbonate. It is possible that calcium carbonate was deposited by water seeping through the sediments. None of the vessels were completely symmetrical, it is likely that the vessels were constructed using a paddle and anvil. Based on surface finishing, the sherds were grouped as follows:

1. Slip dark red to dark reddish brown
2. Slip red
3. Slip reddish yellow

=== Stone tools ===
Around 70 cores, 3976 waste flakes, and 263 tools were recovered from Lapuz Lapuz. About 98% of waste flakes recovered are made of cryptocrystalline quartz (chert). The remaining flakes were made of tektite, basalt, and andesite. Experiments indicate that using cores made of cryptocrystalline quartz from the Jalaud River and hard hammer percussion produces large numbers of flakes, of which less than 6% are conchoidal.

== Analysis ==
=== Collecting strategies ===
Among the twenty-one species of molluscs were found in the excavation, the two significant species found were the terrestrial land snail Rhysota rhea and Thiara (Melanoides) tuberculata. Rhysota composes 70 to 80% of the recovered mollusks by weight, while Thiara represents only around 15%. The reason behind this disparity can be based on the ease of obtaining the mollusc, the amount of meat for a given weight of shell, and the nutritional value of the mollusc.

Rhysota appears to be the most convenient choice for hunter-gatherers, because it is available locally, which means there is less effort in transporting it to the cave. Also, for 1 kg (2.2 lb) of live snail, including the shell, one can obtain 0.75 kg (1.7 lb) of meat. Thiara, on the other hand, is usually found in freshwater muddy environments. The nearest such location from Lapuz Lapuz cave is the Jalaud River, which is 3 km (1.9 mi) away. Given such distance that must be traversed, this can show that Thiara is consumed more as a delicacy than as a staple source of food. Indeed, Thiara is still eaten by the indigenous peoples, and is available in the local market.

Measurements on the so-called measurable X and Y parameters reveals a possible selection strategy used in the gathering of molluscs. These parameters are essentially attributes that are related to the size of the mollusk under consideration. For Thiara, the mean of Y is between 11 and 13 mm (0.4 and 0.5 in), with a range from 8 and 16 mm (0.3 and 0.6 in). For Rhysota, the measured values of X have a mean between 29 and 32 mm (1.1 and 1.3 in), and ranges from 23 and 36 mm (0.9 and 1.4 in). These statistics show that within the range of sizes of mollusks that are collected, there is some preference to selecting the larger ones.

=== Hunting and gathering techniques ===
The diversity of mammal remains in Lapuz Lapuz cave indicates the wide range of environments in which hunters find target animals. The presence of turtle, fish, and crustaceans may have come from Jalaud River. The excavated layers show a great dependence on smaller animals such as bats and rats, as the staple source of food, with occasional consumption of larger mammals such as pigs and deer. This parallels the trend in the consumption of Rhysota and Thiara.

=== Butchering techniques ===
Most bones in Lapuz-Lapuz cave are shorter than 1.9 cm (0.7 in), and based on the high degree of fragmentation, these are deliberately broken. Also, a significant fraction of the bones are burnt. One possibility is that the bones were used as tools for cooking meat in earthenware.

=== Pottery functions ===
After reconstruction of the recovered sherds, it was observed that there are at least three forms of vessels: a bowl, a ‘goblet’, and a cooking pot, which was the most common. Due to the poor manufacture, it is highly unlikely that these earthenware were transported over a large distance. This marks the vessels as more utilitarian than decorative.

=== Stone tools classification ===
The stone tools excavated, in general, showed no use, even under a low-power microscope. It is argued that, perhaps, the stone tools were used for objects that are soft enough not to leave any striation or mark. Majority of the cores recovered did not show any regular striking pattern, nor any evidence of platform preparation. This might imply that smash-and-grab technology was used, which is widespread in the Philippines from Cagayan Valley to Sulu archipelago. Some of the characteristics of smash-and-grab technology in the Philippines include

1. No deliberate shaping of flakes
2. Use of cryptocrystallize quartz cores
3. Little or no retouch

Still, there is no clear evidence on how these flake tools were used.
