= Bulabog Putian National Park =

Protected area in the Philippines

- IUCN category V (protected landscape/seascape)
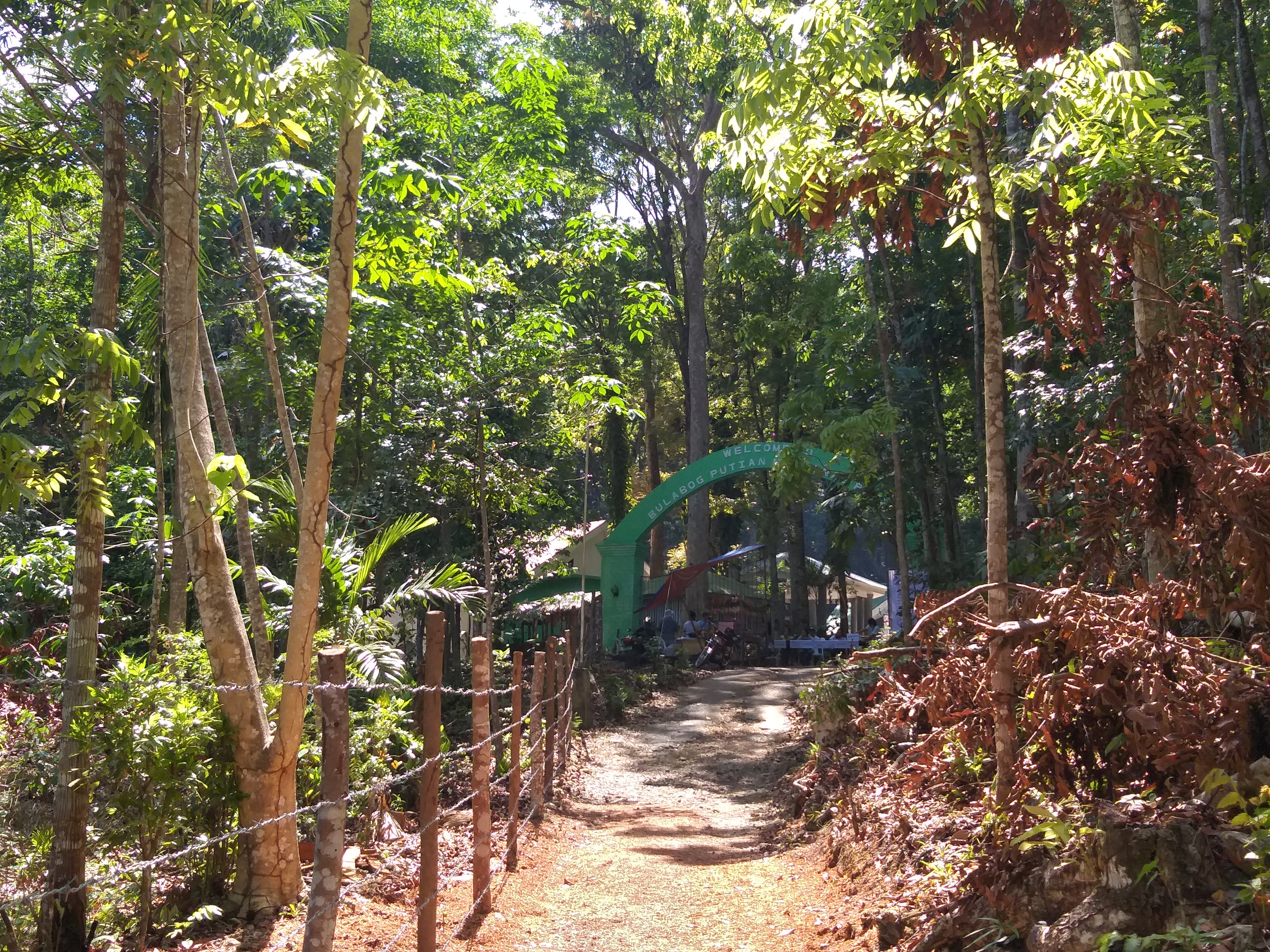
- Entrance of the Bulabog National Park

- Location within Visayas Location within Philippines
- Location: Dingle and San Enrique, Iloilo, Philippines
- Nearest city: Iloilo City, Iloilo, Philippines
- Coordinates: 11°0.03′N 122°37′E
- Area: 854.33 hectares (2,111.1 acres)
- Established: June 14, 1961
- Governing body: Department of Environment and Natural Resources

The Bulabog Putian National Park is a protected wildlife and natural park located in the towns of Dingle and San Enrique in the province of Iloilo on the island of Panay in the Western Visayas region. The park covers an area of 854.33 hectares (2,111.1 acres) along a 40 kilometers (25 mi) trail in this rainforest. It was established in 1961 through Proclamation No. 760 signed by President Carlos P. Garcia. The park is known for its unique geological formation and is the only limestone mountain formation in Iloilo. It is also known as the location of the Cry of Lincud that started the Philippine Revolution in Iloilo in 1898.

== Description ==
Bulabog Putian is located in the northern Iloilo municipalities of Dingle and San Enrique, some 43 kilometres (27 mi) from Iloilo City. It spans the Dingle barangays of Moroboro, Lincud, Camambugan, Caguyuman, and Tulatulaan, and the San Enrique barangays of Rumagayray, Campo, Palje, and Lip-ac. The park's central feature is the Bulabog Putian mountains, which contain the 1,056-foot (322 m) Putian Peak, the highest in Central Iloilo dominating the surrounding plains. The mountain was named for its most distinguishing feature, a white stone wall on the north side that is visible from as far away as Passi.

The park also contains 13 caves, the most prominent of which are the Maestranza Cave, Guiso Cave, and Lapuz Lapuz Cave. The Maestranza Cave is a habitat of an estimated 20,000 fruit bats while the Guiso Cave is home to 18 different species of bats. It also has several springs including the Moroboro Spring. On the park's eastern side lies Lake Bito. A dam of the Jalaur River can also be found in the park.

The Bulabog Putian mountains as viewed from Dueñas.

== Biodiversity ==
The Bulabog Putian National Park supports diverse species of plants and animals. Among its fauna inhabitants are the Philippine coucal, iguanas, monkeys, turtle doves, green imperial pigeons, reptiles, and several species of bats. As a secondary growth forest, it supports hardwood tree species such as dao, molave, and narra.

== See also ==
- List of national parks of the Philippines
