= Sultanate of Sulu after 1915 =

- 1915–present
- Status: Ceremonial institution
- Capital: Jolo, Sulu (symbolic)
- Official languages: Tausūg
- Religion: Sunni Islam
- Government: Ceremonial monarchy
- Sultan since 1915 (government-recognized)
  - 1915–1936: Jamalul Kiram II
  - 1936–1950: More than one Sultan exists but none are recognized
  - 1950–1974: Esmail Kiram I
  - 1974–1986: Mahakuttah Kiram
  - 1986–present: More than one Sultan exists but none are recognized
- Historical era: Post-colonial ceremonial period
  - Carpenter Agreement: 1915
  - Disestablished: present
Preceded by
Sultanate of Sulu

The Sultanate of Sulu after 1915 refers to the continuation of the Sultanate of Sulu as a ceremonial, religious, and dynastic institution within the Insular Government of the Philippine Islands and the later Republic of the Philippines, following the signing of the Carpenter Agreement in 1915 between Sultan Jamalul Kiram II and the United States colonial administration. Under the agreement, the Sultan relinquished his temporal governing authority within U.S.-administered territories, ending the Sultanate's function as a territorial state in the Sulu Archipelago, while not expressly abolishing the Sultanate as an institution.

Contemporary American officials did not regard the Carpenter Agreement as abolishing the Sultanate as a religious or dynastic institution. Governor Frank W. Carpenter later clarified that the agreement was jurisdictionally limited and was not intended to prejudice the Sultanate's authority or claims beyond U.S. territorial jurisdiction, particularly with respect to North Borneo (Sabah). Similarly, Governor-General Francis Burton Harrison, the highest U.S. official in the Philippines at the time the agreement was authorized, stated that the Sultanate had not been legally abolished and that its extinction could not occur solely through administrative non-recognition.

Although the Sultanate no longer exercised territorial sovereignty, the American colonial government continued to recognize the title of Sultan of Sulu held by Sultan Jamalul Kiram II after 1915. As a result, the post-1915 Sultan of Sulu was not regarded by American authorities as a dethroned monarch in the sense applied to rulers of formally abolished monarchies. In 1927, The American Chamber of Commerce Journal remarked on Jamalul Kiram II's continued status, stating:

What other monarch has been ruling since 1894? Though Jamalul has been shorn of much power, his throne is still there and he is still on it.

— The American Chamber of Commerce Journal

Following the death of Sultan Jamalul Kiram II in 1936, President Manuel L. Quezon declined to recognize a successor, citing the view that the Sultanate had effectively ended with Jamalul Kiram II's death. This position was later disputed by American officials and scholars. In 1946, anthropologist H. Otley Beyer stated that "the Sultanate of Sulu was by no means abolished by the Carpenter Agreement," while in 1947, Harrison reiterated that President Quezon lacked the legal authority to abolish the Sultanate through non-recognition alone.

In 1962, President Diosdado Macapagal recognized Esmail Kiram I as Sultan of Sulu, and in 1974, President Ferdinand Marcos recognized Mohammed Mahakuttah Abdullah Kiram as Sultan, along with his son Muedzul Lail Tan Kiram as Crown Prince. While these instances of recognition were influenced by or part of the North Borneo dispute, they nevertheless reflect the fact that the Sultanate was never formally abolished by the Americans as an institution. Following the death of Mohammed Mahakuttah Abdullah Kiram in 1986, no subsequent Philippine president has formally recognized a new Sultan. Nevertheless, as articulated by Harrison, the absence of recognition does not, in itself, constitute legal abolition of the Sultanate.

In the contemporary period, the Sultanate of Sulu persists as a non-sovereign ceremonial institution, retaining cultural, religious, and symbolic significance among the Tausūg and other Moro communities. There are several claimants to the title due to complex succession rules and lack of centralized authority. However, the title of Sultan of Sulu itself is not a title in pretense but a ceremonial title.

== Line of succession ==
The following tree is adapted from the Official Gazette, based on public accounts and documents. It is incomplete and does not constitute an official genealogical chart.

Dashed lines indicate marriages. Dotted lines leading to solid lines indicate adopted heirs.

Genealogical chart of the sultans of Sulu in the modern era

Jamalul Kiram II r. 1894–1936	Muwallil Wasit II^{†} r. 1936	Mora Napsa
Datu Tambuyong	Datu Buyungan	Tarhata Kiram	Datu Ombra Amilbangsa	Dayang Dayang Hadji Pianda Kiram	Sakinurin Kiram	Esmail Kiram I r. 1894–1936	Datu Punjungan Kiram	Mariam Kiram	Rada Kiram	Jahara Kiram
Mahakuttah Kiram r. 1974–1986	Datu Fuad Kiram	4 other siblings	Jamalul Kiram III	Esmail Kiram II	Agbimuddin Kiram	6 other siblings
Datu Muedzul Lail Tan Kiram	6 other siblings

Sultans of Sulu (who effectively reigned; recognized titular rulers after 1936)
9 principal heirs of Sultan Jamalul Kiram II
Claimants

"†" – Muwallil Wasit II was murdered before his coronation

== See also ==
- Sultanate of Sulu
- List of Sultans of Sulu
- Lahad Datu standoff
- North Borneo dispute
- Moro people
- Mindanao
- History of Malaysia
- Sultanate of Maguindanao
- Sultanate of Buayan
