= Muedzul Lail Tan Kiram =

Head of the Royal House of Sulu since 1986

Muedzul Lail Tan Kiram; مُئِجُّلْ لَئِلْ تَنْ كِرَمْ

Head of the Royal House of Sulu (disputed)
- Coronation: 16 September 2012; Darul Jambangan, Maimbung
- Predecessor: Mohammed Mahakuttah Abdullah Kiram
- Raja Muda: Mohammad Ehsn Serman Kiram
- Born: 28 August 1966 (age 60); Jolo, Sulu, Philippines
- Spouse: Mellany S. Kiram
- Issue: 7
- House: House of Kiram
- Father: Mohammed Mahakuttah Abdullah Kiram
- Mother: Pangyan Farida Tan Kiram
- Religion: Sunni Islam

Muedzul Lail Tan Kiram (born 28 August 1966) is the eldest son of Mohammed Mahakuttah Abdullah Kiram, the last titular sultan of Sulu recognized by the government of the Philippines. He is one of the main claimants to the headship of the House of Kiram and therefore a claimant to title of sultan. Between his father's death in 1986 and his coronation in 2012, he described himself by the title by which he was recognized by the Philippine government in 1974, that of Raja Muda (chosen heir apparent or crown prince).

== Personal life ==
Muedzul Lail Tan Kiram was born on 28 August 1966 on the island of Jolo in present-day Philippines, the eldest son of Mohammad Mahakuttah Abdulla Kiram, 34th sultan of Sulu, and his first wife Dayang-Dayang Farida Tan-Kiram.

Muedzul Lail Tan Kiram studied at Universidad de Zamboanga in Zamboanga City where he got his Bachelor of Arts (BA) degree. Between 1995 and 1996, he continued his higher studies in Islam in Lahore, Pakistan. He currently lives on the island of Jolo near the seat of the Sultanate and is involved as a local civic leader on the island and Sulu in general, regularly meeting with the local population.

He is married to Dayang Dayang Pangian Mellany Serman Kiram and has seven children.

== Coronation ==
Datu Muedzul Lail Tan Kiram was crowned as Raja Muda (Crown Prince) of Sulu on 24 May 1974 beside his father in Sulu, under Memorandum Order No. 427, which was issued by President Ferdinand Marcos, President of Philippines. The ceremony was held in Jolo, Sulu. Muedzul Lail Tan Kiram is the last recognised Raja Muda (Crown Prince) by the Philippine government. When his father died in 1986, Muedzul Lail Tan Kiram could not take the crown because of his age, which led to relatives trying to claim the crown for themselves. Raja Muda Muedzul Lail Tan Kiram was crowned Sultan in a coronation event on the island of Jolo on 16 September 2012.

== Royal and Hashemite Order of the Pearl ==
Muedzul Lail Tan Kiram awards the Royal and Hashemite Order of the Pearl as a formal Royal Honor since 2011. The Associazione Insigniti Onorificenze Cavalleresche (Association of Chivalric Honors), an entity under the International Commission for Orders of Chivalry recognizes the Royal Order.

== Regnal name ==
Kiram uses the full regnal name of His Royal Majesty Paduka Mahasari Al-Maulana Ampun Sultan Hadji Muedzul-Lail Tan Kiram ibni Almarhum Sultan Mohammad Mahakuttah Abdulla Kiram, The 35th Sultan of Sulu and North Borneo.

== Honours and awards ==
Muedzul Lail Tan Kiram has received honours from a number of Royal Houses and other awards:

- Grand Cross, Order of the Eagle of Georgia and the Seamless Tunic of Our Lord Jesus Christ (Georgia)
- Grand Cordon, Imperial Order of the Dragon of Annam (Vietnam)
- Grand Cordon, Order of the Ethiopian Lion
- Grand Cross of the Royal Confraternity Of Saint Teotonio
- Accademico d'Onore Classe Speciale - Real Academia Sancti Ambrosii Martyris Italia

== 2013 Lahad Datu standoff ==
Muedzul Lail Tan Kiram clearly and emphatically decried these actions led by Jamalul Kiram III, a self-proclaimed pretender to the throne in a press release and on a Malaysiakini TV interview and other publications.

== Genealogy ==
Muedzul Lail Tan Kiram is the grandson of Sultan Mohammed Esmail Kiram (1950–1973) while Muwallil Wasit II (1936) was his great-grandfather and Sultan Jamalul Kiram II (1893–1936) was his great-granduncle. He is a direct male descendant and claimant to the defunct throne of the Sultanate of Sulu.

=== Ancestry ===
Ancestors of Muedzul Lail Tan Kiram

16. Jamalul Alam
8. Mawallil Wasit Kiram
4. Mohammed Esmail Kiram
9. Mora Napsa
2. Mohammed Mahakuttah Kiram
1. Muedzul Lail Tan Kiram
6. Major Anton M. Tan
3. Farida Tan

Patrilineal descent
1. Muwallil Wasit I of Sulu
2. Salahuddin Bakhtiar
3. Badar ud-Din I
4. Azim ud-Din I (Ferdinand I)
5. Sharaf ud-Din
6. Azim ud-Din III
7. Jamalul Kiram I
8. Mohammad Pulalun Kiram
9. Jamal ul-Azam
10. Muwallil Wasit II
11. Mohammed Esmail Kiram
12. Mohammed Mahakuttah Kiram
13. Raja Muda Muedzul Lail Tan Kiram

== Notes ==
Muedzul Lail Tan Kiram House of Kiram Cadet branch of the Royal House of Sulu Born: 28 August 1966
Preceded by Mohammed Mahakuttah Abdullah Kiram	Head of the Royal House of Sulu (disputed)	Incumbent; Heir: Mohammad Ehsn Serman Kiram
Royal titles
Preceded by Mohammed Mahakuttah Abdullah Kiram	Raja Muda of Sulu	Vacant Coronation
Titles in pretence
Vacant Title last held by Mohammed Mahakuttah Abdullah Kiram	— TITULAR — Sultan of Sulu and North Borneo; 16 September 2012 – present Reason for succession failure: Sovereignty surrendered in 1915; Sabah incorporated into Malaysia; Title disputed among heirs	Incumbent; Heir: Mohammad Ehsn Serman Kiram
