= Muwallil Wasit II of Sulu =

Muwallil Wasit II مُوَلِّلْ وَسِتْ ٢

Sultan of Sulu (titular)
- Nominal reign: 17 July 1936 – 21 November 1936
- Predecessor: Jamalul Kiram II
- Successor: Ombra Amilbangsa (Maimbung); Jainal Abidin (Patikul)
- Died: 21 November 1936; Maimbung, Jolo, Commonwealth of the Philippines
- Issue: Mohammed Esmail Kiram I; Punjungan Kiram; Mariam Kiram; Rada Kiram; Jahara Kiram
- House: Kiram
- Father: Jamal ul-Azam
- Religion: Sunni Islam

Muwallil Wasit II was heir apparent to the Sultanate of Sulu. He became a designate sultan of Sulu after his older brother Jamalul Kiram II's death. He was murdered on 21 November 1936 before his coronation.

He was the younger brother of Sultan Badarud-Din II and Sultan Jamalul Kiram II and Raja Muda (crown prince) of the Sultanate. He was elected on 17 July 1936 by the Ruma Bechara, the council of Datus and Sharifs, as the new sultan. Four months later and before the formal coronation ceremony took place, he was murdered. There had been no new Raja Muda (Crown Prince) named by then, sparking a succession crisis.

By 1936, the Sultanate of Sulu had lost its sovereignty to the Philippines, making the title de facto ceremonial. Due to the succession dispute, the Philippine government was initially reluctant to recognize the title after Jamalul Kiram II's death, reducing the Sulu claimants to the status of pretenders. Mohammed Esmail Kiram I, Muwallil Wasit II's eldest son, later succeeded in his father's claim to the Sultanate of Sulu.
