= Mohammed Mahakuttah Abdullah Kiram =

Sultan of Sulu from 1974 to 1986

Mohammad Mahakuttah Abdullah Kiram مُحَمَّدْ مَهَكُتَّأْ عَبْدُ ٱللّٰه كِرَمْ
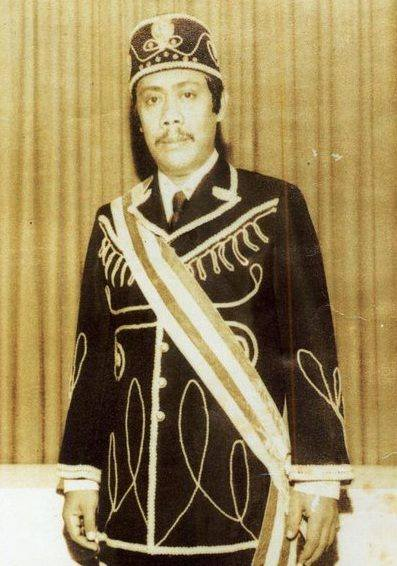

Sultan of Sulu (titular)
- Reign: 24 May 1974 – 16 February 1986
- Coronation: 24 May 1974
- Predecessor: Mohammed Esmail Kiram
- Successor: Muedzul Lail Tan Kiram
- Spouse: Farida Tan-Kiram
- Issue: Muedzul Lail Tan Kiram; Fuad Abdullah Kiram; 4 other siblings
- House: Royal House of Kiram
- Father: Mohammed Esmail Kiram
- Religion: Sunni Islam

Mohammad Mahakuttah Abdullah Kiram was Sultan of Sulu from 1974 until his death in 1986. (Note: From 1980 onward, this position was disputed with his uncle Punjungan Kiram and later with his cousin Jamalul Kiram III.) He was the eldest son of his predecessor Mohammed Esmail Kiram.

Despite never controlling territory, as the remaining sovereignty of the Sulu monarchy had been surrendered to the United States in 1915, he enjoyed official recognition as a non-sovereign monarch from the Philippine government under Ferdinand Marcos. This was mostly done as a means to legitimize the Philippines' claims to Sabah, a former territory of the Sultanate of Sulu, in the North Borneo dispute. He was the last sultan to be afforded official recognition.

Mahakuttah Kiram's coronation in 1974 was sponsored by the Marcos administration. At the time of his coronation, his oldest son, Muedzul Lail Tan Kiram, was crowned beside his father as Raja Muda (Crown Prince) of Sulu at eight years old.

Sultan Kiram died in 1986, one year before Crown Prince Muedzul Lail Tan Kiram became of age to assume the throne. The Philippine national government failed to recognize a new Sultan formally after Mahakuttah's death, creating a succession crisis. The issue was further aggravated by the People Power Revolution, which removed President Marcos, an important supporter of the Sulu sultans. The gap in the sultanate's leadership was filled by pretenders of rival branches.
