= Datu Sadja =

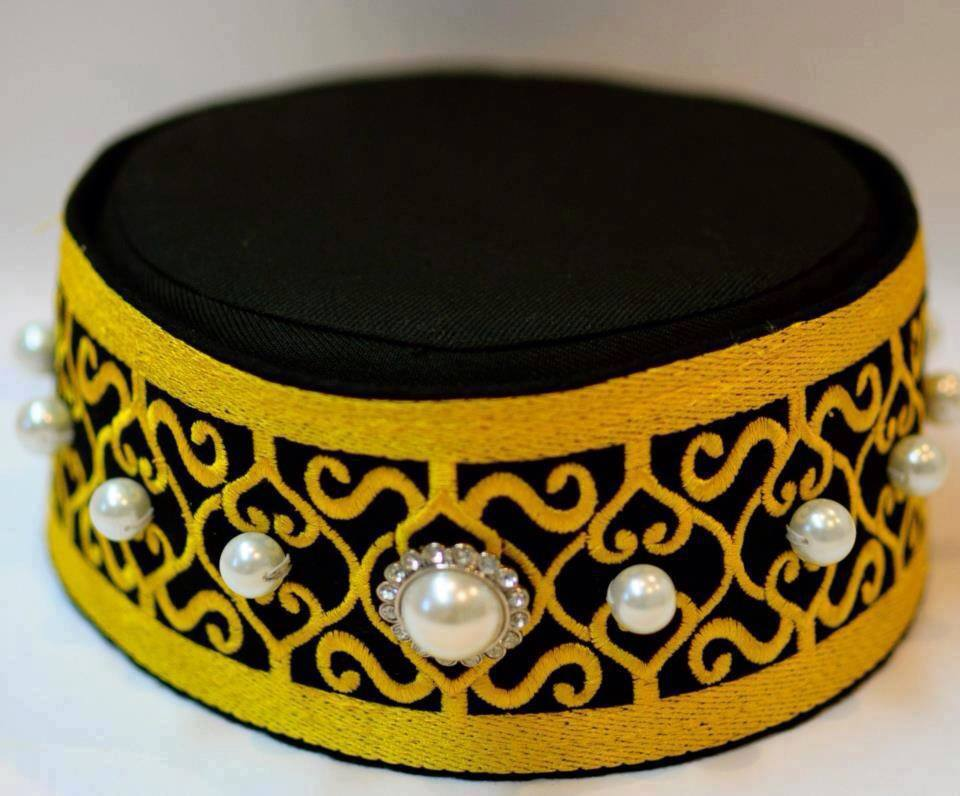
Datu Sadja songkok

Datu Sadja was a senior titled nobility in the Sultanate of Sulu which today is still awarded by the Royal House of Sulu. It is subordinate to the Datu or Su-sultanun which is acquired purely by inherited lineage or formal relationship to the Sultan. The title of Datu is roughly comparable to European sovereign princes or dukes while the title Datu Sadja can be analogous to a marquess or count. The rights of the present day customary titles are protected by a special law in the Philippines known as "The Indigenous Peoples Rights Act of 1997". This law allows traditional leadership titles to be conferred, including the title Datu, in a manner specified under the law's implementing rules and regulations which was issued as Administrative Order No. 1, Series of 1998, by the National Commission on Indigenous Peoples and written specifically under Page 11, Rule IV, Part I, Section 2, Paragraph A-C.

The title of Datu Sadja may be granted for particular merits or achieved through appointment to any of the eight great offices of the realm: Wazir (Prime Minister), Datu Maharaja Adenduk, Datu Maharaja Layla, Datu Amir Bahar are the old great offices. The Royal Commissioner of the Royal Honours & Nobility Commission, Secretary General, Chancellor and Gateway Chronicler King of Arms are the new great offices. This list of offices has varied over time.

In addition, the title Gullal of Datu Sadja is granted if a commoner has performed outstanding deeds or services to the Sultan and the Sultanate through a display of bravery or heroism. The title of Datu Sadja is not hereditary unless the Sultan, in any particular situation, decides otherwise. Preference is given to relatives of past Datu Sadjas. Only those created personally tend to keep the title for life, irrespective of any reappointments or resignations. The title holders hold the style of His Excellency (H.E.). Their spouses hold the title of Dayang and hold the style of Her Excellency (H.E.).

The children of Datus Sadjas enjoy the honorary titles of Tuan (for men) and Sitty (for women). This Tuanship descends via the main male primogeniture.

== See also ==
- Indian honorifics, Filipino and Malay titles originated from these
- Greater India
- Indosphere
- Datuk, Malay equivalent of Datu Sajda
- Datuk (Minangkabau), traditional title in Minangkabau community
- Malay styles and titles
- Princely state
- Principality
