= Jamalul Kiram II =

Sultan of Sulu from 1894 to 1936

Jamalul Kiram II جَمَلُلْ كِرَمْ ٢
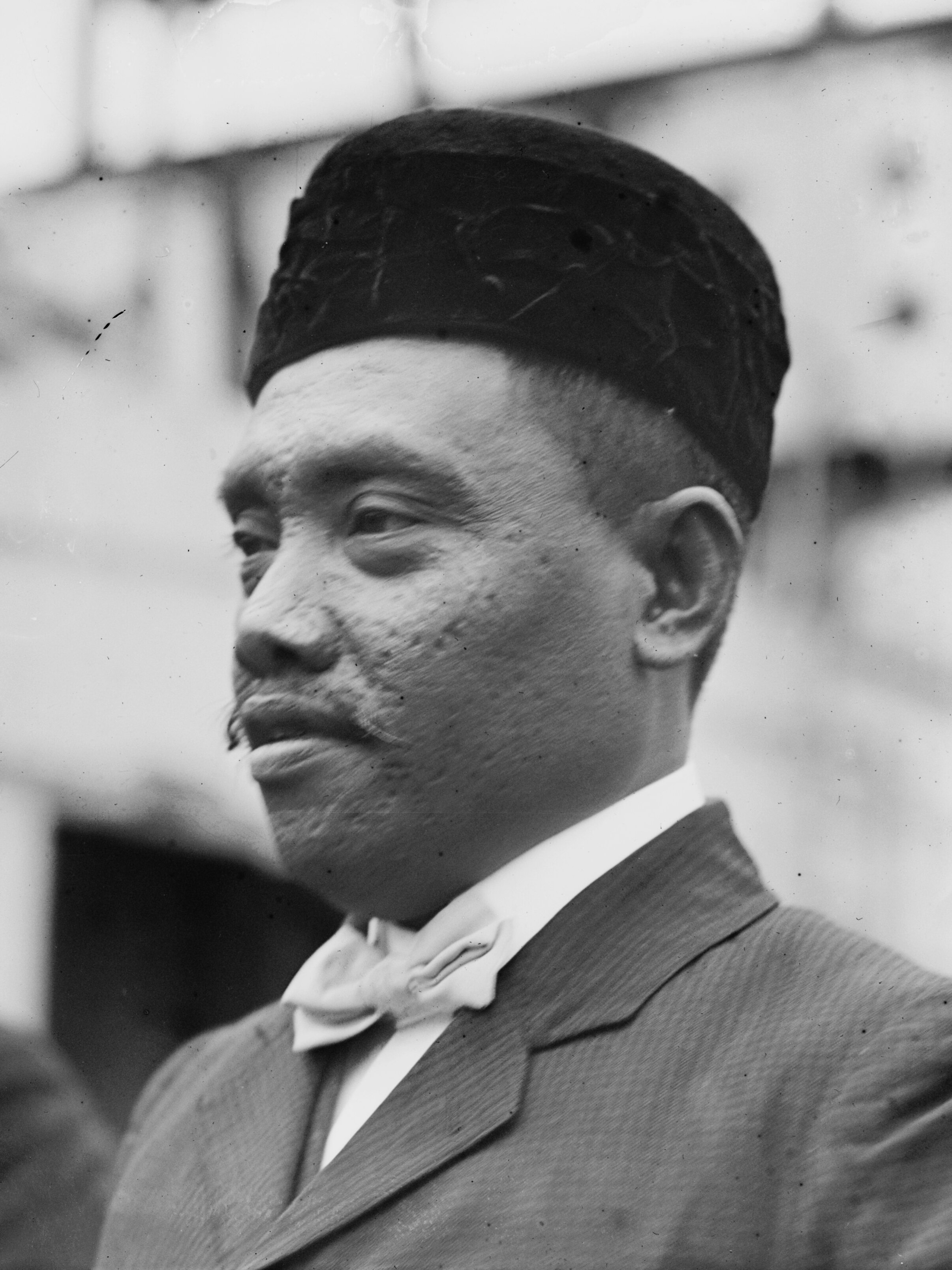
- Jamalul Kiram II, published by Bain News Service

Sultan of Sulu
- Reign: 22 February 1894 – 22 March 1915; Titular: 22 March 1915 – 7 June 1936 (Note: Sovereignty surrendered to the U.S. Insular Government in 1915 through the Carpenter Agreement. Jamalul Kiram II was allowed to keep his title and role as head of Islam in Sulu until his death in 1936. The question of whether the Sultanate's territories in Sabah had also been surrendered later resulted in the North Borneo dispute.)
- Predecessor: Harun Ar-Rashid
- Successor: Monarchy abolished (Sulu annexed by the United States); Muwallil Wasit II (titular)
- Born: Amirul Kiram; 27 March 1868; Jolo, Captaincy General of the Philippines, Spanish Empire
- Died: 7 June 1936 (aged 68); Maimbung, Jolo, Commonwealth of the Philippines
- House: Kiram
- Father: Jamal ul-Azam
- Mother: Sultana Inchi Jamila

Senator of the Philippines from the 12th district
- In office 1931–1934 Serving with Ludovico Hidrosollo
- Appointed by: Dwight F. Davis
- Preceded by: Manuel Camus
- Succeeded by: Balabaran Sinsuat

Jamalul Kiram II (27 March 1868 – 7 June 1936) was the last sultan of Sulu prior to the annexation of Sulu's territory by the Insular Government of the Philippines. During his reign, he signed treaties with several nations. He served under both Spain and the United States.

== Ascension and rule ==
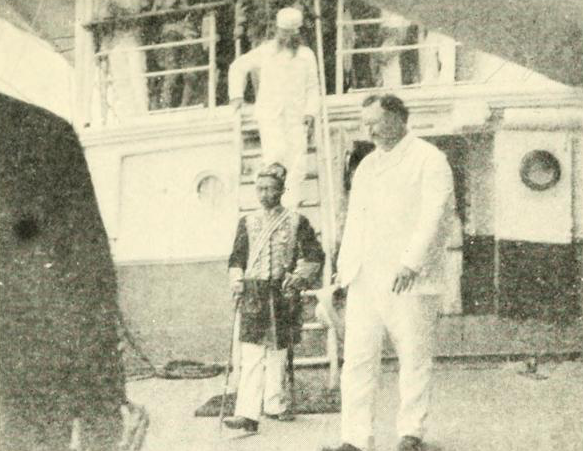
Sultan Jamalul Kiram II with William Howard Taft of the Philippine Commission in Jolo, Sulu (27 March 1901)

Jamalul Kiram II rose to the throne following Sultan Harun Ar-Rashid allegedly being forced to abdicate in 1894 after Kiram's Datu supporters elected him to be sultan. Sultan Jamalul Kiram II ascended to the throne after undergoing the Gibha ceremony, a traditional rite through which a sultan officially becomes the ruler. This ceremony was overseen by Panglima Bandahala, who inherited the responsibility from Binatal Arah. Panglima Bandahala played a pivotal role in the history of the Luuk and Tandu municipalities in Sulu. As a trusted adviser and close relative of the sultan, he held significant positions such as Municipal President and peace emissary. His contributions to the Sultanate of Sulu earned him the reputation of being "a warrior and hero among his peers." Sultan Jamalul Kiram II frequently sought his counsel, addressing him respectfully as "Bapa," meaning uncle. Panglima Bandahala is also the grandfather of Sayyid Capt. Kalingalan Caluang, with their lineage tracing back to Sattiya Munoh, son of Sayyid Qasim, a Hadhrami descendant from the Ba 'Alawi sada.

Over the following decade, tensions in the American-controlled Philippines would break out into insurrection and war, leading the United States to negotiate the Kiram–Bates Treaty in 1899, believing the sultan would be able to suppress Moro resistance to American colonization, as well as ensuring Sulu neutrality in the war broadly. Sultan Jamalul Kiram II and other government advisers and datus, most notably Hadji Butu, agreed to the treaty both desiring American economic support to Sulu's dismal finances, alongside fears of American aggression should they decline.

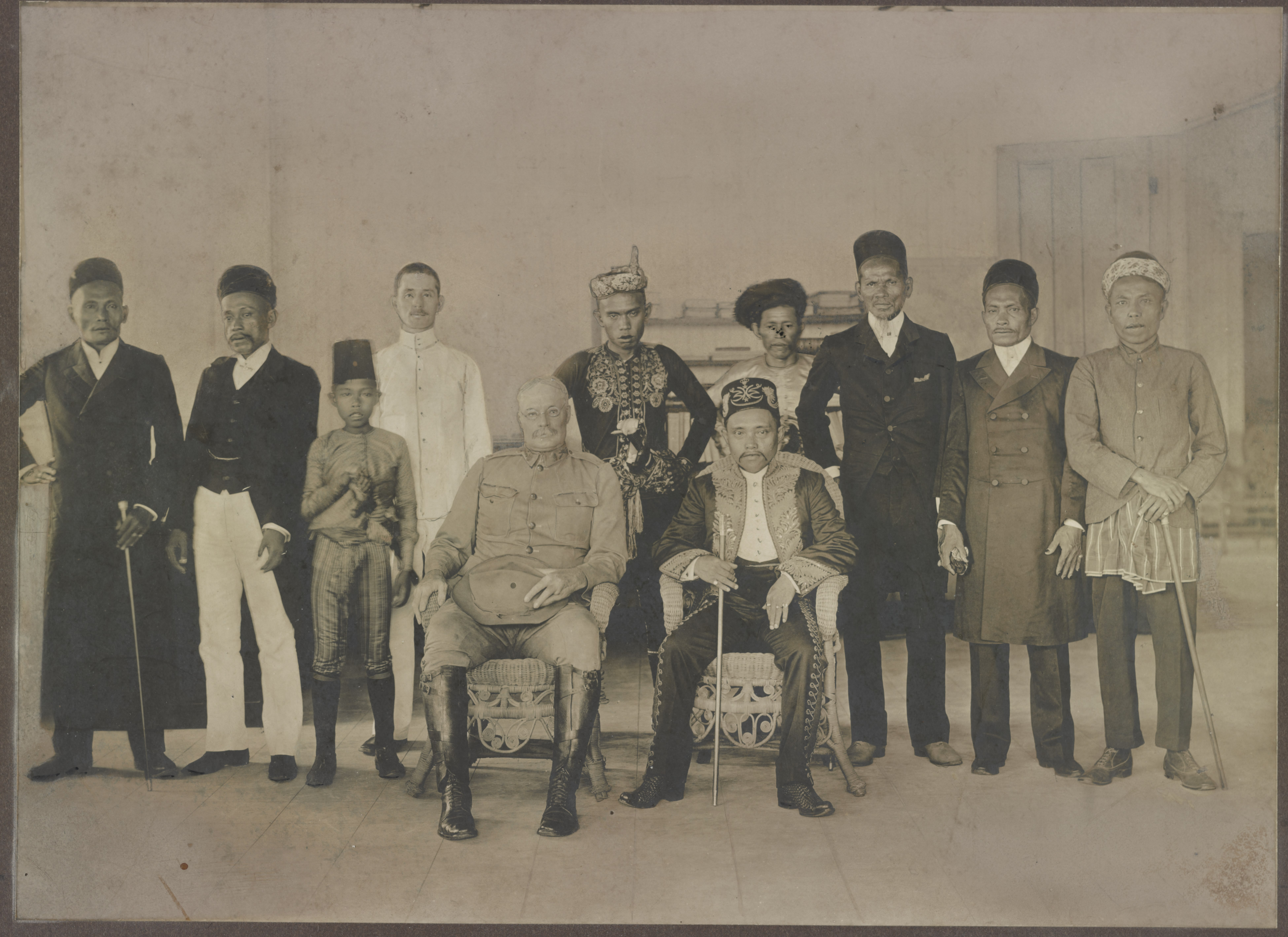
Military Governor Hugh Lenox Scott of the Sulu archipelago and Sultan Jamalul Kiram II of Sulu along with local government officials and hadjis (c. 1905)

The treaty was retracted on the 2 March 1904 however, with the Office of U.S. President Theodore Roosevelt declaring the Kiram–Bates Treaty null and void, following the suppression of the Filipinos to the north. With annexation looming, Kiram joined the Moros struggle against the American expansion, prolonging an asymmetrical war across the Sulu Archipelago against superior equipment and manpower reserves the US possessed. After nine years of warfare, Kiram resigned himself to the Carpenter Treaty on 22 March 1915, effectively constituting the fall of the Sulu Sultanate and enshrining full American sovereignty over its former lands. This officially concluded over 400 years of Sulu independent sovereignty, although the war gains had already been organized into the Department of Mindanao and Sulu.

Kiram was appointed as a senator of the Philippines from the 12th district in 1931, serving for one term until 1934.

== Death ==
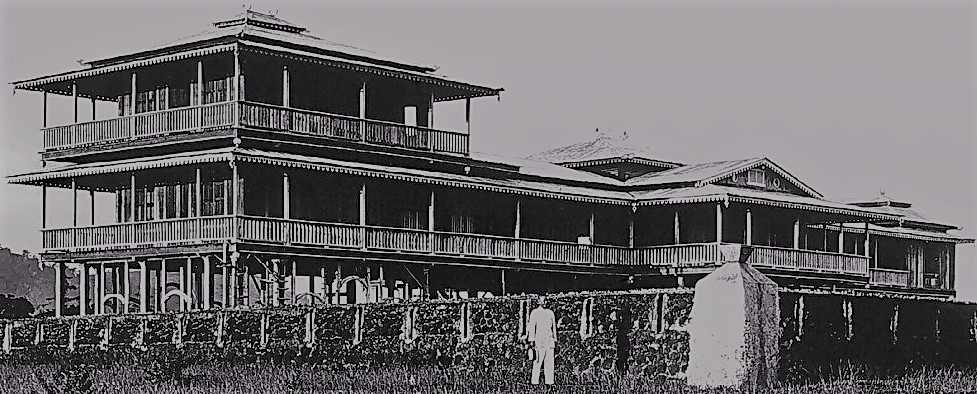
Darul Jambangan (Palace of Flowers), the sultan's residence in Maimbung.

Kiram continued to live in his residence at Maimbung for the remainder of his life, dying after kidney troubles there on the 7 June 1936. Although he had seven daughters, no woman could be appointed as heir or successor according to Islamic law as he had no son. His youngest brother and Rajah Muda (Crown Prince) Muwallil Wasit was proclaimed as the new Sultan, but he was murdered before being crowned.

== Photographs ==
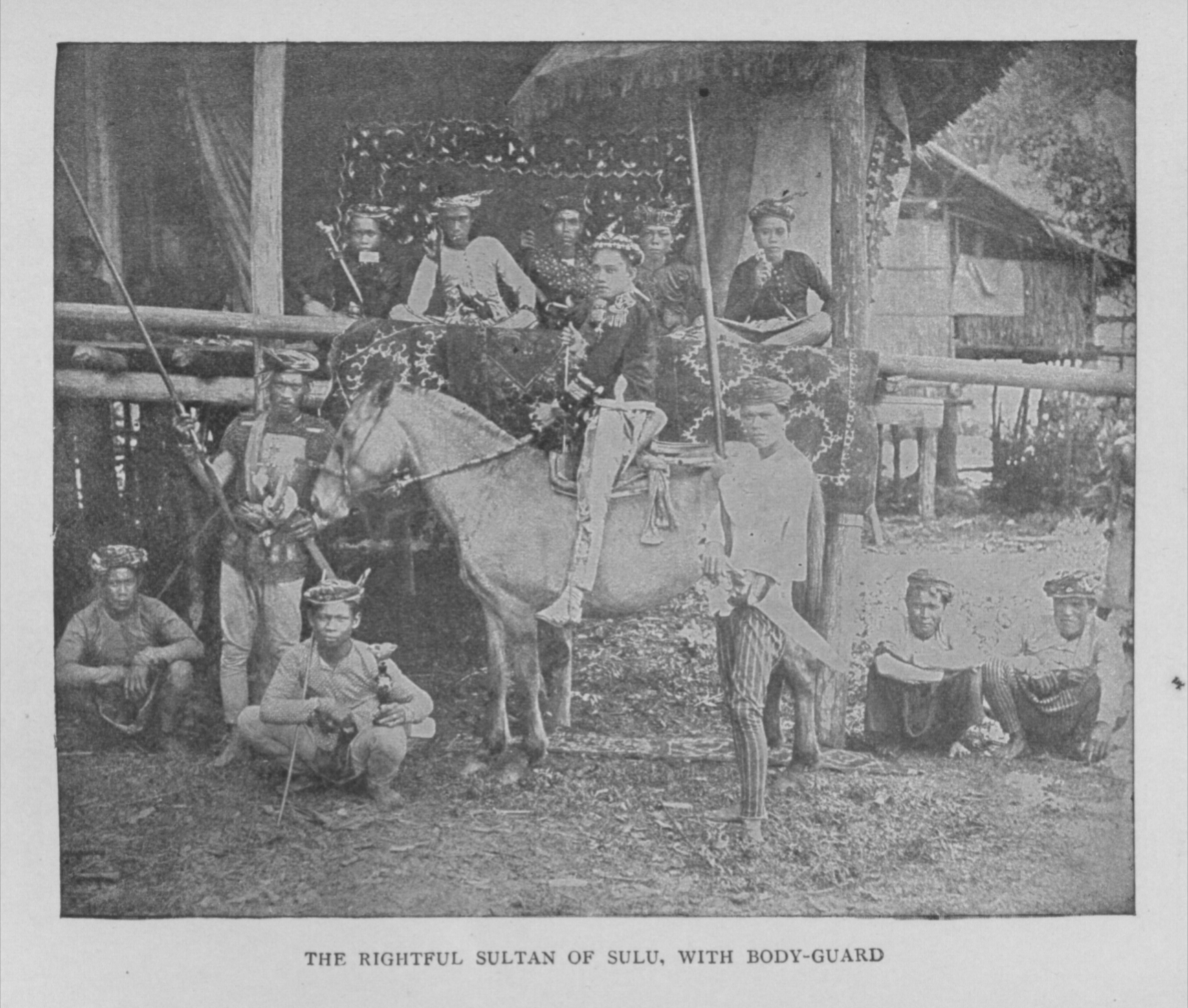
Jamalul Kiram II riding on horseback, earliest known photograph of the sultan. Published by Dean Conant Worcester in 1899

One of the earliest photograph of Jamalul Kiram II was during the reign of Sultan Harun Ar-Rashid (1886–1894). He was depicted riding on a horseback accompanied by several servants.

During the American colonial period, he was photographed during official visits by American officials. He was described as wearing a costume blended with local and European aesthetics.
