= Mohammed Esmail Kiram =

Sultan of Sulu from 1950 to 1974

Sultan of Sulu (titular)
- Reign: 20 November 1950 – December 1973
- Predecessor: Ombra Amilbangsa (Maimbung); Jainal Abidin (Patikul)
- Successor: Mohammed Mahakuttah Abdullah Kiram
- Died: December 1973
- Issue: Mohammed Mahakuttah Abdullah Kiram; Datu Fuad Kiram; 4 other siblings
- House: Kiram
- Father: Muwallil Wasit II
- Mother: Mora Napsa
- Religion: Sunni Islam

Mohammed Esmail Enang Kiram was Sultan of Sulu from 1950 until his death in 1973. He was the first sultan recognized by the Philippine government since 1936.

== Personal life ==
He was the eldest son of Raja Muda Muwallil Wasit II and Mora Napsa. He initially claimed the title of sultan after his father's death in 1936, but was persuaded by Dayang Dayang Piandao, heiress to the late Jamalul Kiram II, to initially give up his claim and become her husband Ombra Amilbangsa's Raja Muda (Crown Prince) instead. On 20 November 1950, after the death of Jainal Abidin (born Datu Tambuyong), another claimant to the throne, he was acclaimed as sultan of Sulu.

== History ==
On 12 September 1962, amid the negotiations for the incorporation of Sabah into what would become Malaysia, he authorized the formal transfer of that territory, formerly known as North Borneo (controlled by Sulu until a controversial 1878 cession), to the Philippine government under the administration of President Diosdado Macapagal. This was mostly done as a means to legitimize the Philippines' claims to Sabah, a former territory of the Sultanate of Sulu, in what would be known as the North Borneo dispute.

Esmail never controlled territory, as the remaining sovereignty of the Sulu monarchy had been surrendered to the United States in 1915, which limited him to a ceremonial role. Nevertheless, in his dealings with the Philippine government he in practice enjoyed official recognition as a non-sovereign monarch.

Mohammed Esmail died in December 1973 and was succeeded by his eldest son and Raja Muda (Crown Prince) Mohammed Mahakuttah Abdullah Kiram the next year. The accession of the new sultan was recognized and supported by President Ferdinand Marcos.
