= Esmail Kiram =

Esmail (Esmael, Ismail, or Ismael) Kiram may also refer to:

- Mohammed Esmail Kiram I (Esmail E. Kiram I)
- Esmail Kiram II
