= John C. Bates =

3rd Chief of Staff of the United States Army

John Coalter Bates
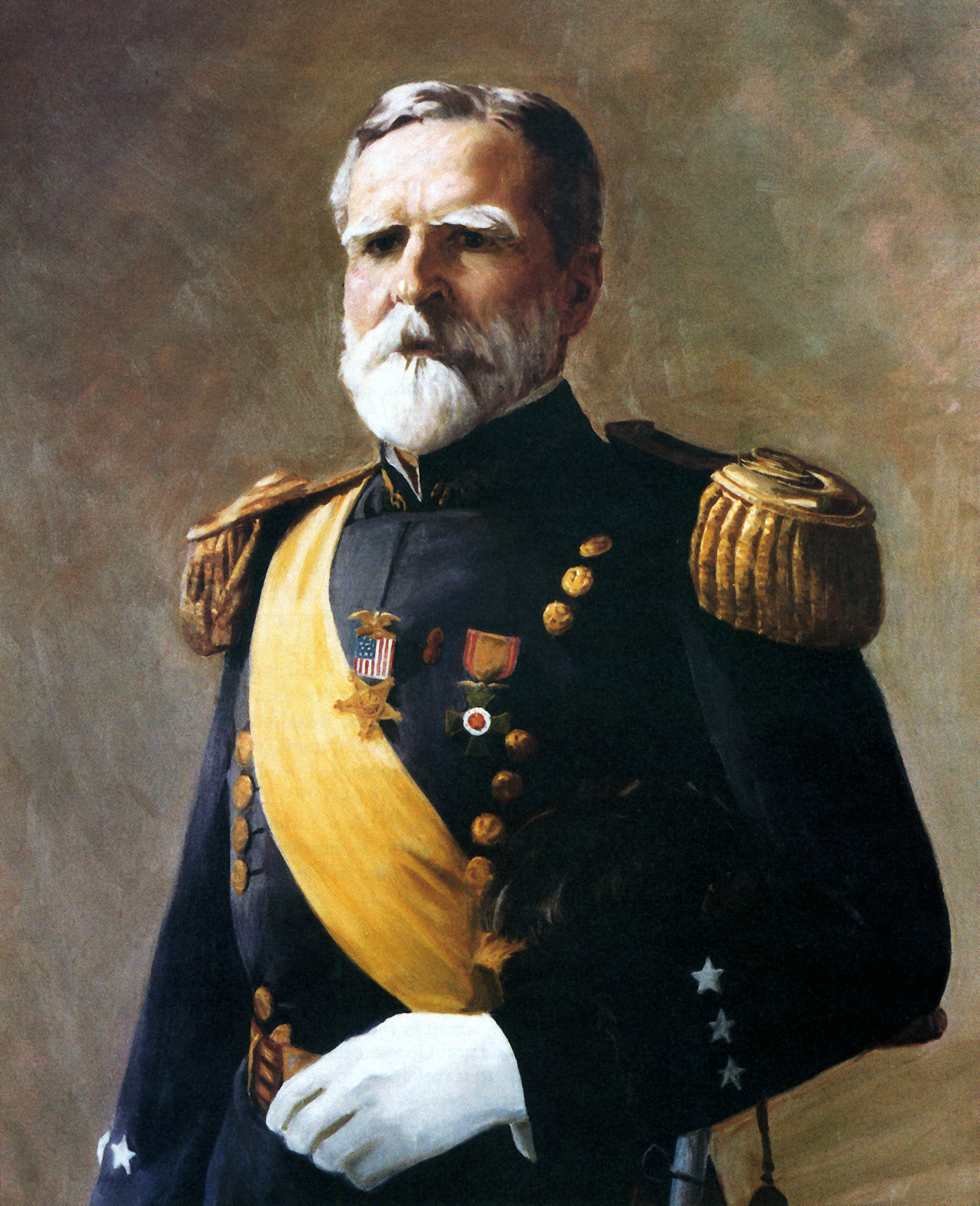
- General John C. Bates, official portrait by Cedric Baldwin Egeli
- Born: August 26, 1842; St. Charles County, Missouri, U.S.
- Died: February 4, 1919 (aged 76); San Diego, California, U.S.
- Burial place: Arlington National Cemetery
- Relatives: Edward Bates (father)
- Military career
- Allegiance: United States
- Branch: United States Army
- Service years: 1861–1906
- Rank: Lieutenant General
- Commands: Chief of Staff of the United States Army; 1st Division, Eighth Army Corps
- Conflicts: American Civil War; Battle of Antietam; Battle of Fredericksburg; Battle of Chancellorsville; Battle of Gettysburg; American Indian Wars; Spanish–American War; Philippine–American War

John Coalter Bates (August 26, 1842 – February 4, 1919) was a United States Army officer who served as Chief of Staff of the United States Army from January to April 1906. Along with Arthur MacArthur Jr., Bates was one of the last American Civil War veterans still on active duty in the United States military at the time of his retirement.

== Early life and education ==
Bates was born in St. Charles County, Missouri to congressman and future Attorney General Edward Bates and Julia Davenport Coalter. He was educated at Washington University in St. Louis prior to joining the Army at the outbreak of the Civil War.

== Military career ==
Bates was commissioned a first lieutenant with the 11th Infantry Regiment in May 1861. He later became an aide to General George G. Meade, reaching the brevet rank of lieutenant colonel for gallant and meritorious service in operations, resulting in the capture of Richmond and surrender of General Robert E. Lee's army in April 1865.

Bates later served on the Indian Frontier for many years (being promoted to major in 1882 and to lieutenant colonel in 1886), was made a colonel of the 2nd Infantry Regiment in 1892, and in May 1898 was promoted to brigadier general of an Independent Brigade consisting of the 3rd Infantry Regiment and 20th Infantry Regiment in the Spanish–American War and commanded a division of volunteers in the Philippines in the early stages of the Philippine–American War. He was military governor of Cienfuegos in 1899 and went that year to the Philippines, where he conducted negotiations with the Sultan of Sulu. From 1900 to 1901, he commanded the 1st Division, Eighth Army Corps, conducted operations against insurgents in southern Luzon, and then commanded that department.

Bates commanded a provisional division in maneuvers at Fort Riley and commanded the Departments of the Missouri and the Lakes from 1901 to 1904 and later the Northern Division for a year before serving as Chief of Staff of the United States Army from January 15 to April 13, 1906. During this time, he was promoted to Lieutenant general. He retired from active service in April 1906 at his request, shortly before reaching the mandatory retirement age of 64. He was the last Army Chief of Staff to have served in the American Civil War.

== Later life and death ==
Bates was a member of the Military Order of the Loyal Legion of the United States, the Grand Army of the Republic and the Society of the Army of Santiago de Cuba. He died in San Diego, California on February 4, 1919.

== Dates of rank ==
Insignia	Rank	Component	Date
	First lieutenant	Regular Army	1 May 1861
	Captain	Regular Army	1 May 1863
	Brevet major	Regular Army	1 August 1864
	Brevet lieutenant colonel	Regular Army	9 April 1865
	Major	Regular Army	6 May 1882
	Lieutenant colonel	Regular Army	19 October 1886
	Colonel	Regular Army	25 April 1892
	Brigadier general	Volunteers	4 May 1898
	Major general	Volunteers	8 July 1898
	Brigadier general	Regular Army	2 February 1901
	Major general	Regular Army	15 July 1902
	Lieutenant general	Regular Army	1 January 1906

Military offices
Preceded by Adna Chaffee	Chief of Staff of the United States Army; January – April 1906	Succeeded by J. Franklin Bell
