= Kiram–Bates Treaty =

1899 treaty between the United States and Sulu

Treaty between the United States of America and the Sultanate of Sulu
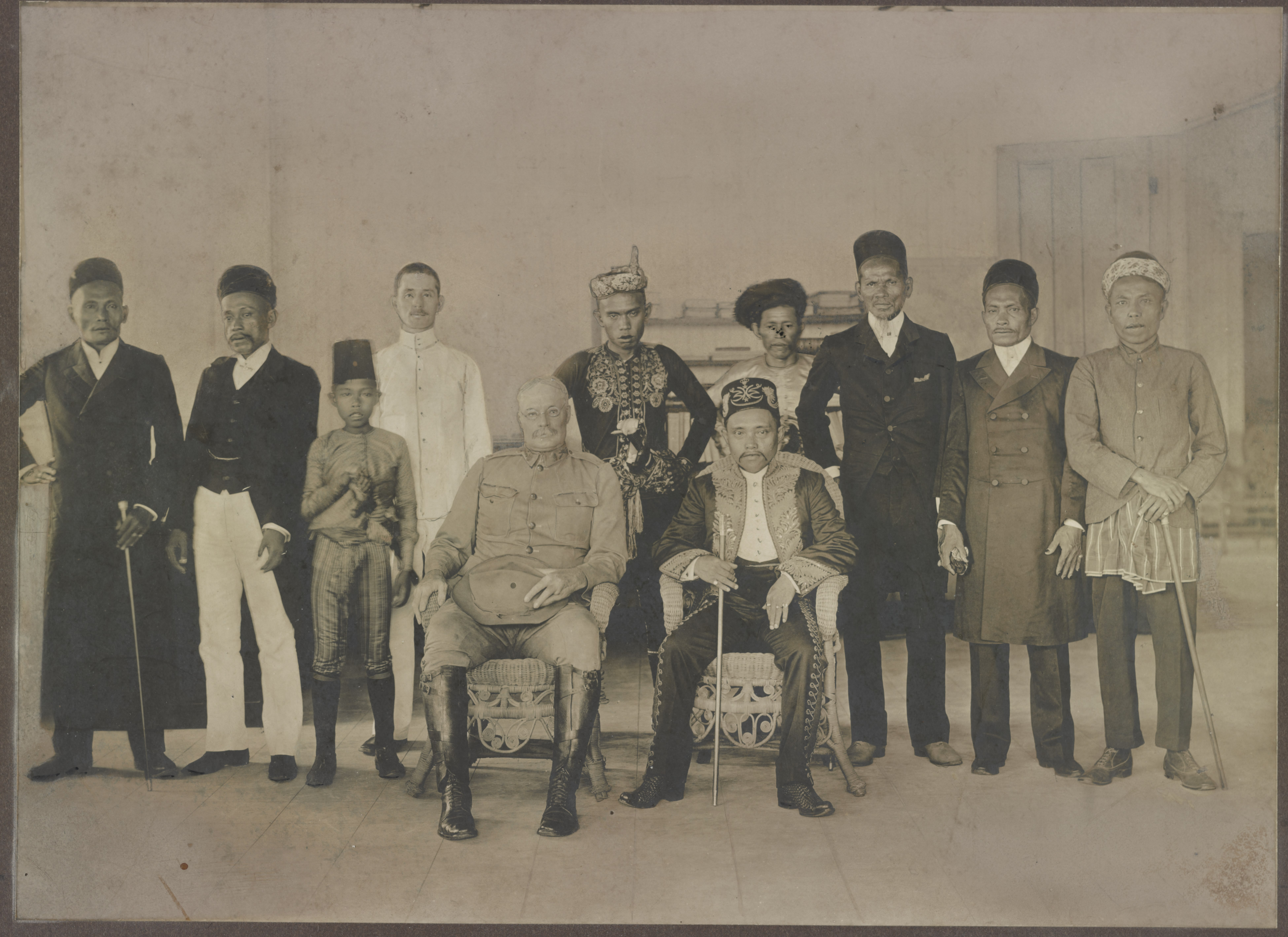
- Military Governor Hugh Lenox Scott of the Sulu archipelago and Sultan Jamalul Kiram II along with local government officials and hadjis (c. 1905)
- Signed: 20 August 1899
- Location: Jolo, Sultanate of Sulu
- Negotiators: Brigadier General John C. Bates; Sultan Jamalul Kiram II
- Signatories: (Sulu Sultanate) Sultanate of Sulu; United States
- Languages: English; Tausug
- On 02 March 1904, President Theodore Roosevelt declared the Kiram-Bates Treaty null and void.

The Kiram–Bates Treaty, also known as the Bates Treaty, was a treaty signed by the United States and the Sultanate of Sulu during the Philippine–American War. The treaty functioned to prevent the entry of the Sulu Sultanate into the Philippine–American War while the United States concentrated its forces in northern Luzon.

Although it is referred to as a "treaty", it was titled an agreement, which was of lesser status under international practices, as US law did not require ratification of an "agreement" by the US Senate.

== Background ==
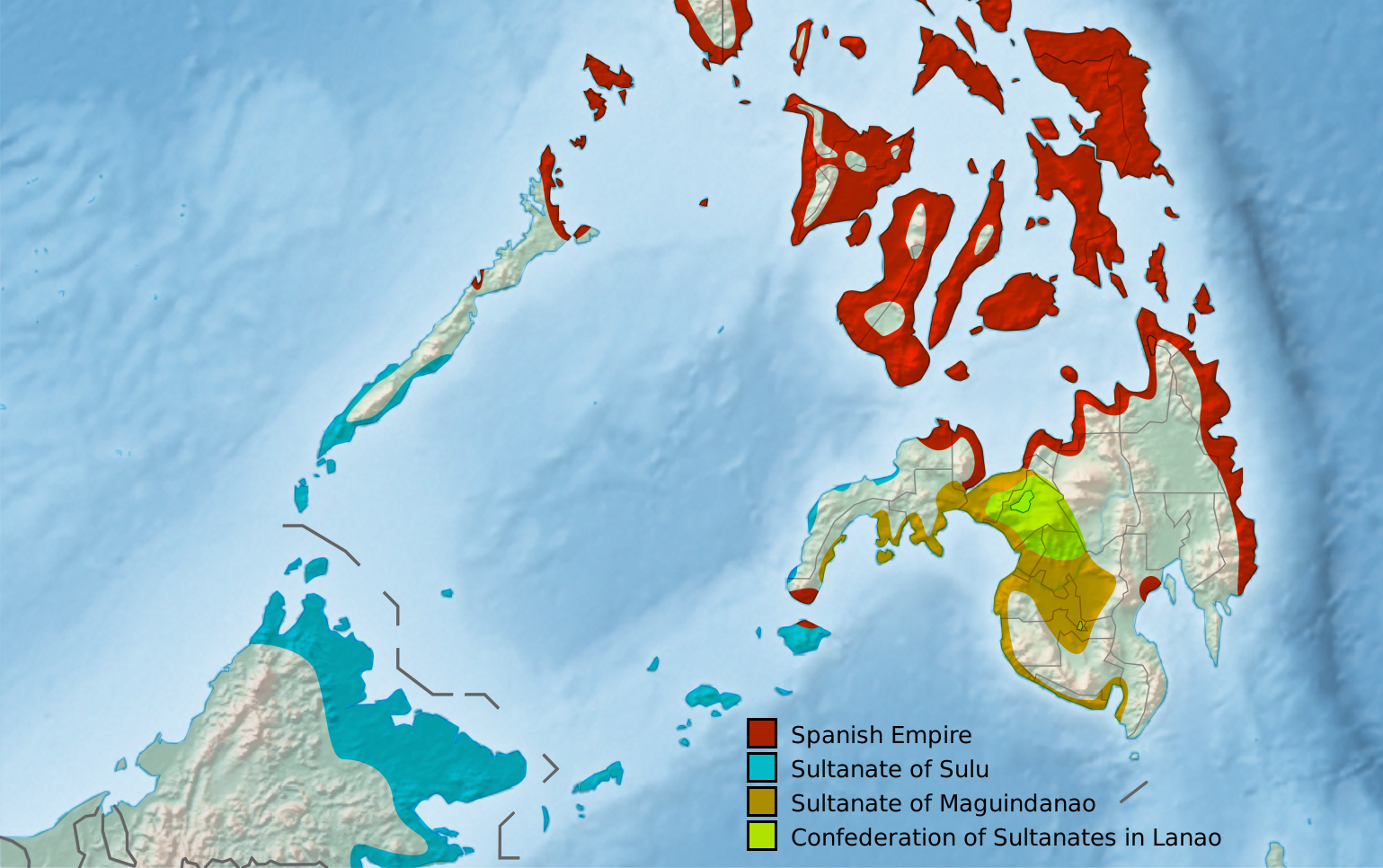
Map of the approximate extents of the Moro Sultanates in Mindanao in the late 19th century, showing the Sultanate of Sulu, Sultanate of Maguindanao, and the Confederation of Sultanates in Lanao.

The Spanish Treaty of Peace in 1878 with the Sulu Sultanate had granted Spain suzerainty. It permitted the establishment of a small garrison on Siasi Island and in the town of Jolo. When the Philippine–American War broke out, the US had to concentrate its limited forces in the north. To hold Moro resistance to its colonization of the Sulu Archipelago at bay, the United States, represented by Brigadier General John C. Bates, forged an agreement with the Sulu Sultanate.

Major General Elwell Stephen Otis sent Bates orders to agree with the Sultan of Sulu:

You are hereby appointed and constituted an agent on the part of the United States military authorities in the Philippines to discuss, enter into negotiations, and perfect, if possible, a written agreement of character and scope as hereinafter explained, with the Sultan [of Sulu] which upon approval at these headquarters and confirmation by the supreme executive authority of the United States, will prescribe and control the future relations, social and political, between the United States Government and the inhabitants of the [Sulu] archipelago.

— General Elwell Otis, Letter to Brigadier General Bates

Otis mistakenly assumed the Sultan was the ruler of all Moros, concluding that Bates needed to agree with him and acknowledge the transfer of the 1878 treaty with the Spaniards. However, with a close reading of supporting documents from the Philippine Commission, Bates discovered that while Spain ceded their rights to the United States in the Treaty of Paris, the Spaniards merely held suzerainty over the Sultanate of Sulu and not sovereignty. Suzerainty is a relationship between two sovereign (yet unequal) states, in which the lesser ("vassal") state cedes certain political controls (such as trade) to the more powerful state, usually in return for some consideration, such as protection. Sovereignty means the complete power and authority of one state over another, with autonomy granted or permitted by the sovereign power. Otis overlooked, which disproved that Spain had a valid basis in international law to include the Sulu Archipelago in its cessation of the Philippines to the United States.

The memo recommended an entirely new treaty, similar to the British treaties in India, that would recognize each rajah as a semi-autonomous ruler and use money as leverage. It had been reported to Bates that the Sultan's income is notoriously deficient and that his desire for American protection stems from economic development. Bates used the USS Charleston, the first modern cruiser the Moros had seen, to intimidate the Sultan and his datus into accepting the treaty.

== Treaty provisions ==
In place of the Spanish treaty, the Bates Treaty included the recognition of US sovereignty over Sulu and its dependencies, mutual respect between the US and the Sultanate of Sulu, Moro autonomy, non-interference with Moro religion and customs, and a pledge that the "US will not sell the island of Jolo or any other island of the Sulu Archipelago to any foreign nation without the consent of the Sultan." Moreover, Sultan Jamal ul-Kiram and his datus (tribal chiefs) were to receive monthly payments in return for flying the American flag and for allowing the US the right to occupy lands on the islands.

The Sultan did not want to acknowledge US sovereignty over his land. Still, he was pressured to accept it by his prime minister and adviser, Hadji Butu Abdul Bagui, and two of his top-ranking datus, Datu Jolkanairn and Datu Kalbi. Hadji Bagui exerted all of his influence to prevent another bloody war, recognizing the folly of armed resistance against a colonizing world power. Hadji Bagui and his son, Hadji Gulamu Rasul, later favored integrating the Moros into the Philippine Republic.

A critical translation error exists in this treaty. The Tausug version stated, "The support, aid, and protection of the Jolo Island and Archipelago are in the American nation." However, the English version read: "The sovereignty of the United States over the whole Archipelago of Jolo and its dependencies is declared and acknowledged." The word "sovereignty" was not used anywhere in the Tausug version.

== Consequences ==
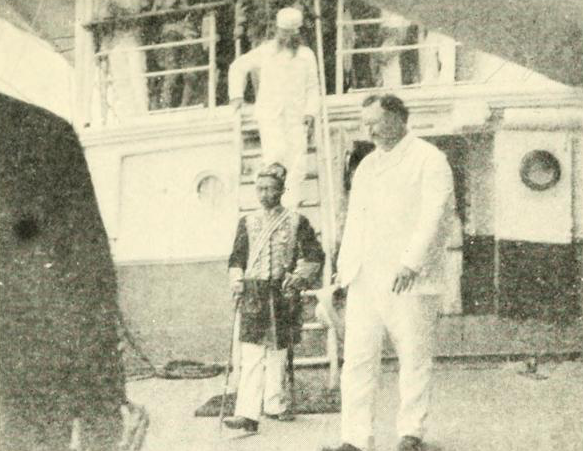
Sultan Jamalul Kiram II with William Howard Taft of the Second Philippine Commission in Jolo, Sulu (27 March 1901)

The Bates Treaty did not last very long. After the United States had achieved its goal of suppressing the resistance in northern Luzon, it unilaterally abrogated the Bates Treaty on March 2, 1904, claiming that the Sultan had failed to quell Moro resistance and that the treaty hindered effective colonial administration of the area. Payments to the Sultan and his datus were also stopped but were later restored by the Taft Commission in November 1904.

In reality, Bates never intended to ratify the treaty. As he would later confess, the agreement was merely a temporary expedient to buy time until Filipino forces in northern Luzon were defeated.

== See also ==
- Philippine–American War
- Moro Rebellion
- Tausūg people
- Treaty of Paris (1898)
- Operation Enduring Freedom – Philippines
- Spanish–Moro conflict
