= Jamal ul-Azam =

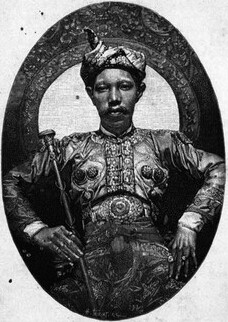
- Photograph by Joseph Montano and P. Rey, c. 1879

Sultan of Sulu
- Reign: 1862–1881
- Predecessor: Moh. Pulalun Kiram
- Successor: Mohammed Badarud-Din II
- Died: April 8, 1881; Sultanate of Sulu

Jamal ul-Azam (d. 1881), also spelled Jamalul Azam, was the sultan of Sulu from 1862 to 1881. He maintained extensive contracts with British and German traders. These were done to counter Spanish dominance in Mindanao. In 1878, he allowed Gustav Overbeck to have north Borneo.

To subside hostilities between Sulus and the Spanish military, he was convinced to sign a peace treaty on July 1878.

== Appearance and personality ==
The French doctor Joseph Montano gave an account of his court. During his time of visit, the sultan and his court were conducting shooting exercises. Montano commented that the sultan was accompanied by his son Brahamuddin. During the conduct of their discussion, they proceeded to the audience hall accompanied by his Afghan religious adviser.

His manners was described by the French doctor as cordial and dignified. He also further added the sultan has a keen interest in geopolitics.

He described both Sultan Jamalul Azam and his son as:

...magnificently dressed in the richest satins from China; their kris and their rings are adorned with beautiful stones; their surroundings show much less luxury, except perhaps for the kris with finely chiselled handles are encrusted with pearls, diamonds and rubies...

— Joseph Montano, Voyage aux Philippines et en Malaisie (1886)

== Rule ==
=== Occupation of Sulu ===
After Captain Pascual Cervera took control of Jolo, the datus and Sultan Jamalul Azam moved to Bud Datu and later to Likup. Due to Jolo falling into Spanish control, the datus formed a loyal party for the sultan. They viewed the establishment of the garrison in Jolo with hostility.

Azam opposed peace and encouraged hostilities for over two years. Juramentados and small groups frequently attacked the garrison. In February 1877, a large Sulu force of over 2,000 attacked the garrison but was repelled. Despite numerous defeats, including a major attack in September 1877, the Sultan continued to plan for future attacks. The juramentados became more treacherous, hiding their weapons and attacking guards who were unaware. This situation persisted until June 1878.

Datu Harun Ar-Rashid convinced Sultan Azam to make negotiations with the Spanish. On July 1878, Col. Carlos Martinez, representing the Spanish colonial government in Sulu, made a peace treaty with Azam. The peace treaty declared that most of the status of sultan would remain unchanged such as laws, customs, and internal affairs except in regulations and firearms. The treaty also declared that all foreign political connections shall be subjected by the Spanish colonial government in the Philippine Islands.

=== Geopolitics ===
Jamalul Azam was interested in European news, particularly about Spain's position. He would request his subjects newspapers from Europe especially on Britain and Spain. During this time, the Sultanate of Sulu remained independent despite Spanish colonial rule. He leased part of Northern Borneo to a British company and had a steamer connecting Maimbung to Labuan and Singapore. According to an account by Joseph Montano, Azam's involvement in trade was influenced by local geopolitics and European competition, making it important for him to stay informed.

== Death ==
Azam died in April 8, 1881. Before his death, he sent a message to the governor of Sulu at Jolo that an attack from Sulus was imminent. In April 10, 1881, an attack was made at the garrison. In his will, Azam wrote that his successor as sultan will be Amirul Kiram, later known as Jamalul Kiram II. Col. Rafael Gonzalez de Rivera, instead, recommended Muhammed Badarud-Din to succeed him.

His death in 1881 caused an extended contest for succession to the sultanate. This resulted in a tentative peace in 1894.
