= Sultanate of Sulu =

1457–1915 state in Southeast Asia

Coordinates: 6°03′07″N 121°00′07″E

Sultanate of Sulu كَسُلْتَنَنْ سِنْ سُوْݢْ (Tausug) Kasultanan sin Sūg
- 1457–1915 (Note: Jamalul Kiram II surrendered his sovereignty over territory in the Philippines in 1915, de facto marking the end of the sultanate's existence. He was allowed to keep his title and role as head of Islam in Sulu until his death. No legal documents have been signed explicitly abolishing the sultanate. The Philippines, as part of its claim to Sabah in the North Borneo dispute, has occasionally revived the sultanate's institutions since 1962, when it accepted a "cession" of North Borneo by the heirs to Jamalul Kiram II, which had been under either lease or cession (depending on interpretation) to the North Borneo Chartered Company since 1878. The royal family's descendants are still treated as royalty by the people in Sulu, constituting a form of non-sovereign monarchy. The Philippine government has not recognized any individual as titular "sultan" since 1986, leading to the rise of various pretenders.)
- Flag (late 19th century)

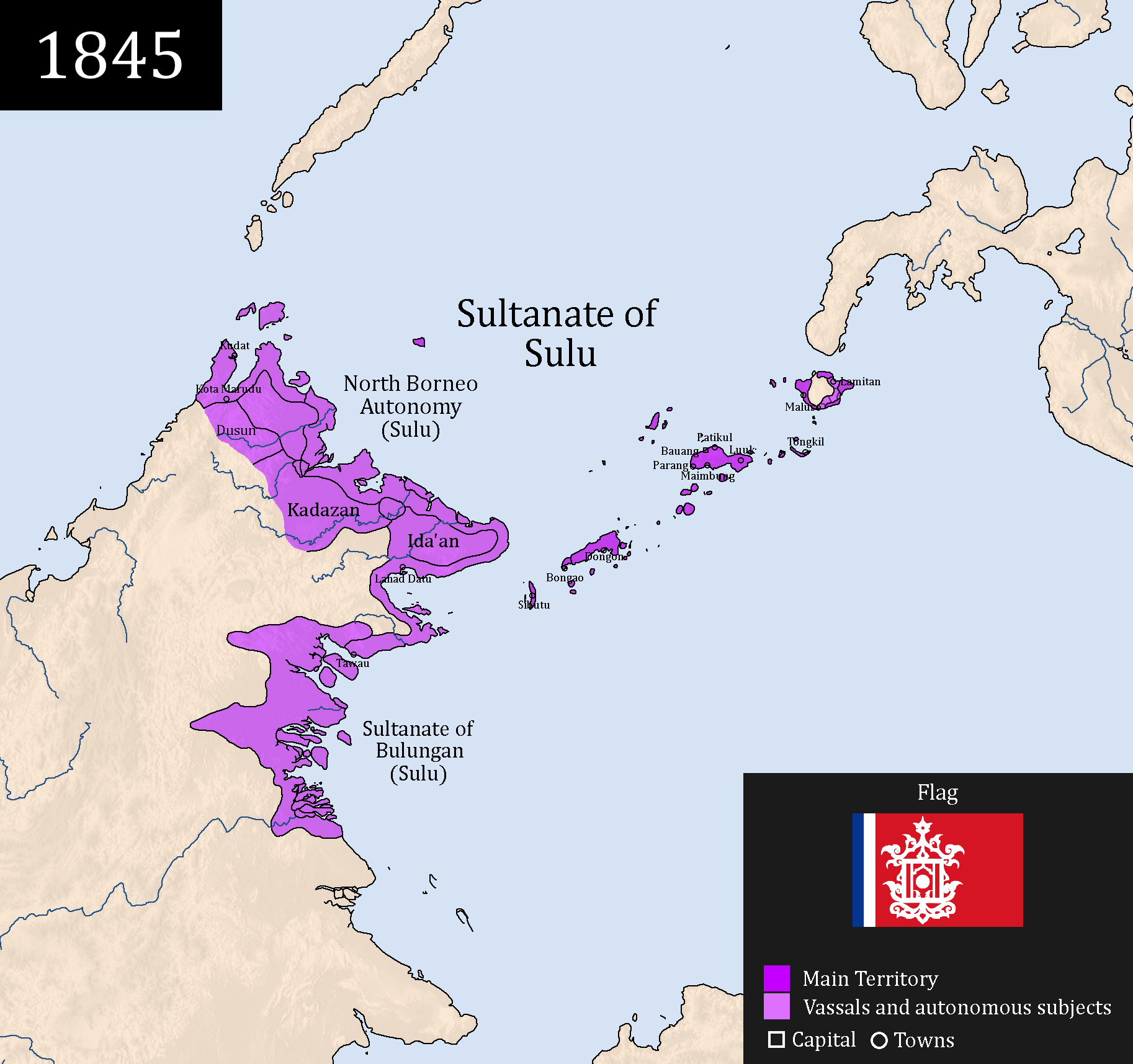
- Map showing the extent of the Sultanate of Sulu in 1845, with Northeast Borneo lowlands being under its nominal control.
- Status: Bruneian vassal (1457–1578); Sovereign state (1578–1851); Spanish protectorate (1851–1899); U.S. protectorate (1899–1915)
- Capital: Buansa (1457–1878); Maimbung (1878–1893); Palawan (1893–1915)
- Common languages: Tausug, Sama–Bajau, Malay
- Religion: Sunni Islam
- Government: Unitary Islamic absolute monarchy
- Sultan
  - 1457–1480 (first): Sharif ul-Hāshim
  - 1894–1915 (last): Jamalul Kiram II
- Legislature: Ruma Bechara
- History
  - Established: c. 1457
  - Spanish–Moro conflict: 1565–1898
  - Moro Rebellion: 1902–1913
  - Department of Mindanao and Sulu: 23 July 1914
  - Annexation to the United States: 22 March 1915
- Currency: Philippine Peso or barter for local use
Preceded by
Precolonial barangay
Lupah Sug
Sultanate of Brunei
Succeeded by
1702; Captaincy General of the Philippines
Calamianes
1878; Dutch East Indies
1881; North Borneo
1915; Insular Government of the Philippines
- Today part of: Philippines; Malaysia; Indonesia

The Sultanate of Sug (Sulu) (Tausug: Kasultanan sin Sūg; Central Sama: Kasultanan Sūg or Kasultanan Sūk; Malay: Kesultanan Suluk; Filipino: Kasultanan ng Sulu or Sultanato ng Sulu) was a Sunni Muslim Tausūg (Note: According to WH Scott, even though the sultanate was ruled by Tausūg people, the subjects of the kingdom were mixed of Bajau, Butuanon, Malay Muslim, Samal, Yakan ethnicity.) state that ruled the Sulu Archipelago, coastal areas of Zamboanga City, and certain portions of Palawan in today's Philippines, alongside parts of present-day Sabah, North Kalimantan and in north eastern parts of Borneo and Berau.

The sultanate was founded either on November 17, 1405 or 1457 (Note: The generally accepted date of the establishment of the sultanate by modern historians is 1457. However, the National Historical Commission of the Philippines list the date as "around 1450", or simply "1450s", due to uncertainty. On the other hand, independent Muslim studies marked the day to a more exact date 17 November 1405 (24th of Jumada al-awwal, 808 AH).) by Johore-born explorer and Sunni religious scholar Sharif ul-Hashim, the 1st Sultan of Sulu. Paduka Mahasari Maulana al Sultan Sharif ul-Hashim became his full regnal name; Sharif-ul Hashim is his abbreviated name. He settled in Indanan, Buansa, Sulu. The sultanate gained its independence from the The Sultanate of Brunei in 1578.

At its peak, it stretched over the islands that bordered the western peninsula of Zamboanga Region in Mindanao in the east to Palawan/Palawanon located in the Philippines in the north. It also covered areas in the northeast of Borneo (Sarawak, Berau, Sabah and etc.), stretching from Marudu Bay, Sabah to Tepian, Sembakung subdistrict, North Kalimantan. Another source stated the area included stretched from Kimanis Bay, which also overlaps with the boundaries of the Bruneian Sultanate. Following the arrival of western powers such as the Spanish, the British, the Dutch Empire, French, Germans, and the Americans, the Sultan’s thalassocracy and its sovereign political powers were relinquished by 1915 through an agreement, known as the Agreement of Carpenter (it’s known term: The Carpenter Agreement), it was signed with the United States of America. The Sulu Sultanate after the Carpenter Agreement, 1915 continued to exist under a ceremonial institution of varying recognition.

In Kakawin Nagarakretagama, the Sultanate of Sulu is referred to as Solot, one of the countries in the Tanjungnagara archipelago (Kalimantan-Philippines), which is one of the areas that is under the influence of the mandala area of the Kingdom of Majapahit in the archipelago.

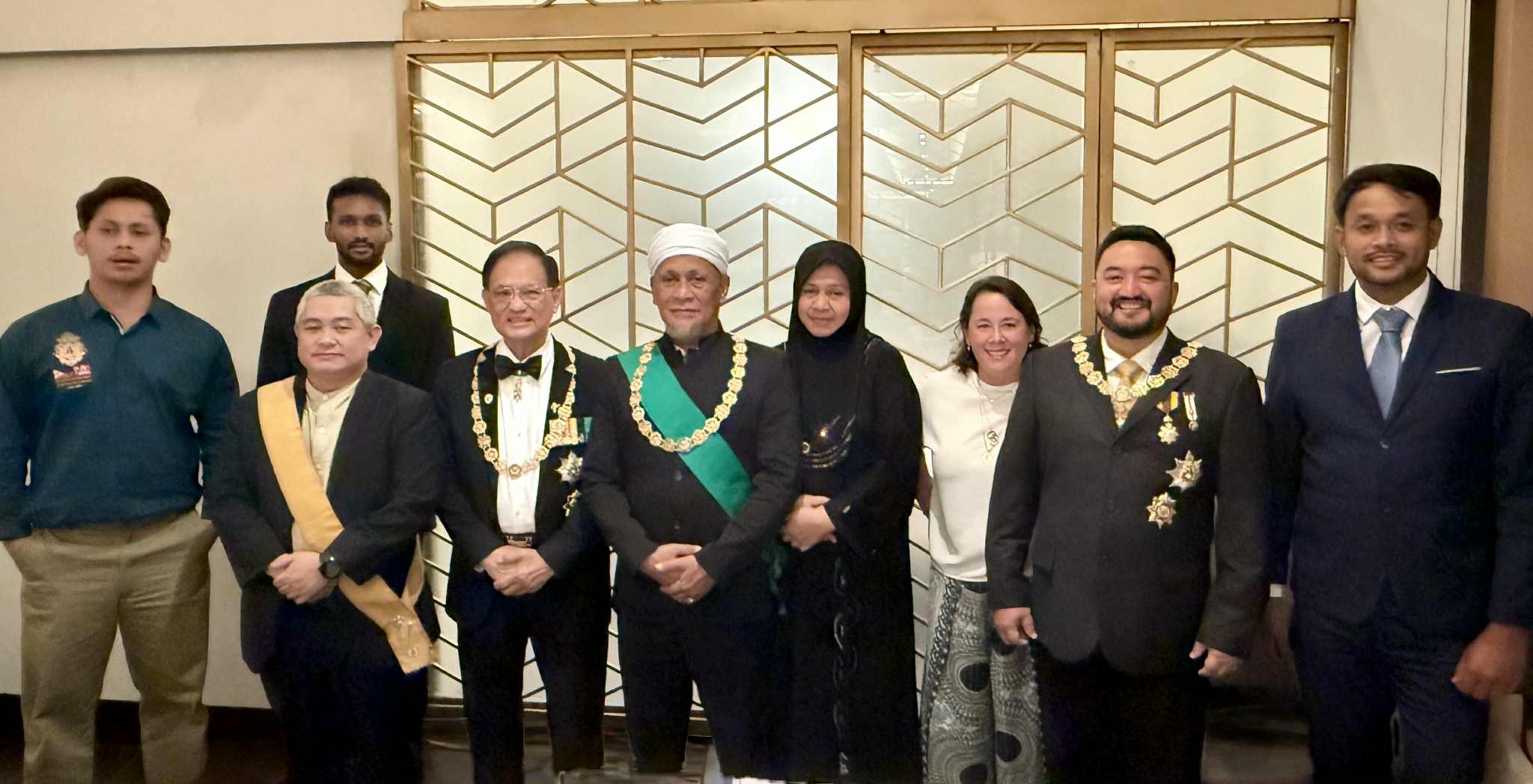
From left to right Royal Sultanate of Sulu Officers HRH Maharaja Adinda Datu Nizamuddin S. Kiram, Secretary General & Royal Ambassador HH Datu Sadja Dr. Matthew Pajares Yngson Rajah of Tambulian, Vice Chancellor HH Datu Sadja Dr. William Chung Tang-Fong Rajah of Tongkil, HRM Sultan Muedzul Lail T. Kiram The 35th Sultan of the Sulu Archipelago, HRM Dayang Dayang Pangian Mellany S. Kiram, HH Dayang Maria Isabel Nieto Delos Reyes, Chancellor Amir Bahar of Sulu HH Datu Kevin Randolph Carrion Limjoco, Royal Ambassador H.E. Apo Gloman Membrere Merritt Rajah of Samtoy & Luzon Ilocano

== History ==
=== Pre-establishment ===
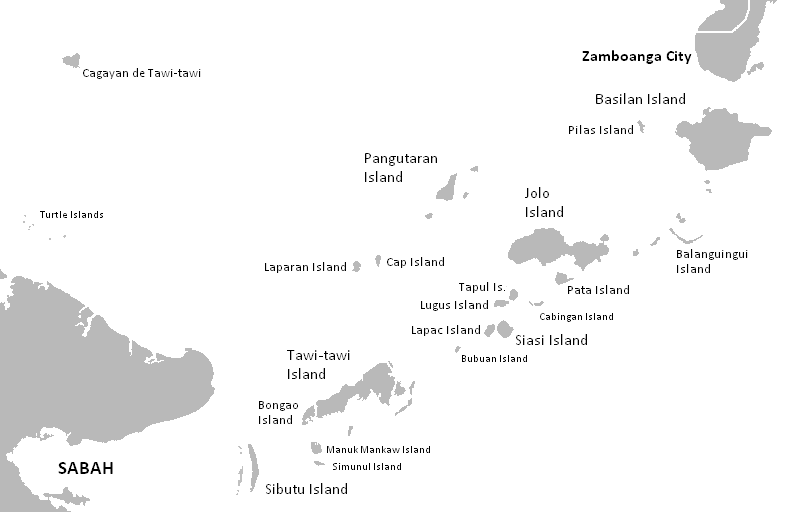
Map of the Sulu Archipelago

The present area of the Sultanate of Sulu was once under the influence of the Bruneian Empire before it gained its own independence in 1578. During the 13th century the people of Sulu began migrating to present-day Zamboanga and Sulu archipelago from their homelands in northeastern Mindanao. Scott (1994) writes that the Sulu are the descendants of ancient Butuanons and Surigaonons from the Rajahnate of Butuan, which was then Hindu, like pre-islamic Sulu. They moved south and established a spice trading port in Sulu. Sultan Batarah Shah Tengah, who ruled as sultan in 1600, was said to be an actual native of Butuan. The Butuanon-Surigaonon origins of the Tausugs are suggested by the relationship of their languages, as the Butuanon, Surigaonon and Tausug languages are all members of the Southern sub-family of Visayan. Later, the earliest known settlement in this area soon to be occupied by the sultanate was in Maimbung, Jolo. During this time, Sulu was called Lupah Sug. The principality of Maimbung, populated by Buranun people (or Budanon, literally means "mountain-dwellers"), was first ruled by a certain rajah who assumed the title Rajah Sipad the Older. According to Majul, the origins of the title rajah sipad originated from the Hindu sri pada, which symbolises authority. The principality was instituted and governed using the system of rajahs. Sipad the Older was succeeded by Sipad the Younger.

Some Chams who migrated to Sulu were called Orang Dampuan. The Champa civilization and the port-kingdom of Sulu engaged in commerce with each other which resulted in merchant Chams settling in Sulu, where they were known as Orang Dampuan in the 10th–13th centuries. In contrast to their cousins in the Butuan Rajahnate, who considered themselves diplomatic competitors of Champa for China trade, (under Butuan's Rajah Kiling); instead, Sulu freely traded with the Champa civilization. The Orang Dampuans from Champa however were eventually slaughtered by envious native Sulu Buranuns due to the wealth of the Orang Dampuan. The Buranun were then subjected to retaliatory slaughter by the Orang Dampuan. Harmonious commerce between Sulu and the Orang Dampuan was later restored. The Yakans were descendants of the Taguima-based Orang Dampuan who came to Sulu from Champa. Sulu received civilization in its Indic form from the Orang Dampuan.

During the reign of Sipad the Younger, a Sunni Sufi scholar and mystic named Tuan Mashā′ikha (Note: Mashā′ikha is an Arabic term which originated from mashā′ikh, which means "an intelligent or pious man".) arrived in Jolo in 1280 CE. (Note: The generally accepted date for the coming of Tuan Mashā′ikha is 1280 CE, however, other Muslim scholars dated his coming only as second half of the 13th century".) Little is known to the origins and early biography of Tuan Mashā′ikha, except that he is a Muslim "who came from foreign lands" at the head of a fleet of Muslim traders, or he was issued from a stalk of bamboo and was considered a prophet, thus well respected by the people. Other reports, however, insisted that Tuan Mashā′ikha together with his parents, Jamiyun Kulisa and Indra Suga, were sent to Sulu by Alexander the Great (who is known as Iskandar Zulkarnain in Malay Annals). However, Najeeb Mitry Saleeby, a Lebanese American doctor who wrote A History of Sulu in 1908 and other studies of the Moros, dismisses this claim by concluding that Jamiyun Kulisa and Indra Suga were mythical names. According to tarsila, during the coming of Tuan Mashā′ikha, the people of Maimbung worshipped tombs and stones of any kind. After he preached Islam in the area, he married Sipad the Younger's daughter, Idda Indira Suga, who bore three children: Tuan Hakim, Tuan Pam and 'Aisha. Tuan Hakim, in turn, begot five children. From the genealogy of Tuan Mashā′ikha, another titular system of aristocracy called "tuanship" started in Sulu. Apart from the Idda Indira Suga, Tuan Mashā′ikha also married another "unidentified woman" and begot Moumin. Tuan Mashā′ikha died in 710 A.H. (equivalent to 1310 AD), and was buried in Bud Dato near Jolo, with an inscription of Tuan Maqbālū.

A descendant of the Sunni Sufi Shaykh Tuan Mashā′ikha named Tuan May also begot a son named Datu Tka. The descendants of Tuan May did not assume the title of tuan, but instead, used datu. This was the first time datu was used as a political institution. During the coming of Tuan Mashā′ikha, the Tagimaha people (literally means "the party of the people") from Basilan and several places in Mindanao, also arrived and settled in Buansa. After the Tagimaha came the Baklaya people, (which means "seashore dwellers"), who are believed to have originated from Sulawesi, and settled in Patikul. After these came the Bajau people (or Samal) from Johor. The Bajau were driven towards Sulu by a heavy monsoon, some of them to the shores of Brunei and others to Mindanao. The population of Buranun, Tagimaha, and Baklaya in Sulu created three parties with distinct systems of government and subjects. In the 1300s the Chinese annals, Nanhai zhi, reported that Brunei invaded or administered the Philippine kingdoms of Butuan, Sulu and Ma-i (Mindoro), which did not regain their independence until later date. According to the Nagarakretagama, the Majapahit Empire under Emperor Hayam Wuruk invaded Sulu in 1365. However in 1369, the Sulus rebelled and regained independence and in vengeance assaulted the Majapahit Empire and its province Po-ni (Brunei), as well as the northeast coast of Borneo and thereafter went to the capital, looting it of treasure and gold. In the sacking of Brunei, the Sulus stole two sacred pearls from the Bruneian king. A fleet from the Majapahit capital succeeded in driving away the Sulus, but Po-ni was left weaker after the attack. Since Chinese historiographies later recorded there to be a Maharaja of Sulu, it is assumed that the Majapahit did not take it back, and it was a rival to it. By 1390 CE, Rajah Baguinda Ali, a prince of the Pagaruyung Kingdom, arrived at Sulu and married into the local nobility. At least in 1417, when Sulu rivaled Majapahit according to Chinese annals, three kings (or monarchs) ruled three civilized kingdoms in the island. Patuka Pahala (Paduka Batara) ruled the eastern kingdom (Sulu Archipelago) -- he was the most powerful; the western kingdom was ruled by Mahalachi (Maharajah Kamal ud-Din), ruler of Kalimantan in Indonesia; and the kingdom near the cave (or Cave King) was Paduka Patulapok from Palawan Island. The Bajau settlers were distributed among the three kingdoms. During this time, Sulu avenged itself for Majapahit Imperialism by encroaching upon the Majapahit Empire as the alliance of the three Sulu kings had territory that reached East and North Kalimantan, which were former Majapahit provinces.

Moumin's descendants the son of Tuan Mashā′ikha populated Sulu. After some time, a certain Timway Orangkaya Su'il was mentioned by the second page of tarsila; he received four Bisaya slaves (people from the Kedatuan of Madja-as) from Manila (presumably Kingdom of Maynila) as a sign of friendship between the two countries. The descendants of Su'il also inherited the title Timway, which means "chief". On tarsila's third page, it accounts the fact that the slaves were the ancestors of the inhabitants in the island to Parang, Lati, Gi'tung, and Lu'uk respectively.

The fourth page then narrates the coming of the Buranun (addressed in the tarsila as "the Maimbung people"), Tagimaha, Baklaya, and finally the drifted Bajau immigrants from Johor. The condition of Sulu before the arrival of Islam can be summarized as such: The island was inhabited by several cultures, and was reigned over by three independent kingdoms ruled by the Buranun, Tagimaha, and Baklaya peoples. Likewise, the socio-political systems of these kingdoms were characterized by several distinct institutions: rajahship, datuship, tuanship and timwayship. The arrival of Tuan Mashā′ikha afterwards established a core Islamic community in the island.

=== Islamization and establishment ===
The Sulu Archipelago was an entrepôt that attracted merchants from south China and various parts of Southeast Asia beginning in the 14th century. The name "Sulu" is attested in Chinese historical records as early as 1349, during the late Yuan dynasty (1271–1368), suggesting trade relations around this time. Trade continued into the early Ming dynasty (1368–1644); envoys were sent in several missions to China to trade and pay tribute to the emperor. Sulu merchants often exchanged goods with Chinese Muslims, and also traded with Muslims of Arab, Persian, Malay, or Indian descent. Islamic historian Cesar Adib Majul argues that Islam was introduced to the Sulu Archipelago in the late 14th century by Chinese and Arab merchants and missionaries from Ming China. The seven Arab missionaries were called "Lumpang Basih" by the Tausug, and were Sunni Sufi scholars from the Ba 'Alawi sada of Yemen. A yellow-colored flag was used in Sulu by the Chinese community.

Around this time, a notable Arab judge, Sunni Sufi and religious scholar Karim ul-Makhdum (Note: Also Karimul Makhdum, Karimal Makdum or Makhdum Karim among others. Makhdum came from the Arabic word makhdūmīn, which means "master".) from Mecca arrived in Malacca. He preached Islam, particularly the Ash'ari Aqeeda and Shafi'i Madh'hab as well as the Qadiriyya Tariqa, and many citizens, including the ruler of Malacca, converted to Islam. Sulu leader Paduka Pahala and his sons moved to China, where he died. Chinese Muslims brought up his sons in Dezhou, where their descendants live and have the surnames An and Wen. In 1380 CE, (Note: Another uncertain date in Philippine Islamic history is the year of arrival of Karim ul-Makhdum. Though other Muslim scholars place the date as simply "the end of 14th century", Saleeby calculated the year as 1380 AD corresponding to the description of the tarsilas, in which Karim ul-Makhdum's coming is ten years before Rajah Baguinda's. The 1380 reference originated from the event in Islamic history when a huge number of makhdūmīn started to travel to Southeast Asia from India. See Ibrahim's "Readings on Islam in Southeast Asia.") Karim ul-Makhdum arrived in Simunul island from Malacca, again with Arab traders. Apart from being a scholar, he operated as a trader; some see him as a Sufi missionary from Mecca. He preached Islam, and was accepted by the core Muslim community. He was the second person to preach Islam in the area, after Tuan Mashā′ikha. To facilitate conversion of nonbelievers, he established a mosque in Tubig-Indagan, Simunul, the first Islamic temple to be constructed in the area, or in the Philippines. This later became known as the Sheik Karimal Makdum Mosque. He died in Sulu, although the exact location of his grave is unknown. In Buansa, he was known as Tuan Sharif Awliyā. On his alleged grave in Bud Agad, Jolo, an inscription reads "Mohadum Aminullah Al-Nikad". In Lugus, he is referred to as Abdurrahman. In Sibutu, he is known by his name. The differing beliefs about his grave's location came about because the Qadiri Shaykh Karim ul-Makhdum travelled to several islands in the Sulu Sea to preach Islam. In many places in the archipelago, he was beloved. It is said that the people of Tapul built a mosque honouring him and that they claim descent from Karim ul-Makhdum. The customs, beliefs and political laws of the people changed and adapted to adopt the Islamic tradition.

Sulu abruptly stopped sending tributes to the Ming in 1424. Antonio Pigafetta recorded in his journals that the sultan of Brunei invaded Sulu to retrieve the two sacred pearls Sulu had previously pillaged from Brunei. A sultan of Brunei, Sultan Bolkiah married a princess (dayang-dayang) of Sulu, Puteri Laila Menchanai, and they became the grandparents of the Muslim prince of Maynila, Rajah Matanda. Manila was a Muslim city-state and vassal to Brunei before the Spanish colonized it and converted it from Islam to Christianity. Islamic Manila ended after the failed attack of Tarik Sulayman, a Muslim Kapampangan commander, in the failure of the Conspiracy of the Maharlikas, when the formerly Muslim Manila nobility attempted a secret alliance with the Japanese shogunate and Bruneiean sultanate (together with her Manila and Sulu allies) to expel the Spaniards from the Philippines. Many Tausugs and other native Muslims of Sulu Sultanate already interacted with Kapampangan and Tagalog Muslims called Luzones based in Brunei, and there were intermarriages between them. The Spanish had native allies against the former Muslims they conquered like Hindu Tondo which resisted Islam when Brunei invaded and established Manila as a Muslim city-state to supplant Hindu Tondo.

The Portuguese who arrived in the Philippines before Spanish colonization and encountered the kingdoms therein have this to say of the Sulu Sultanate.

~Entry from Duarte Barbosa in, “Livro das coisas do Oriente”, [1516, with later aditions, until 1549]. Maria Augusta da Veiga e Sousa, ed., O Livro de Duarte Barbosa (Edição crítica e anotada), Vol. 2 (Lisbon: Instituto de Investigação Científica Tropical, 2000), 403-407. Original manuscript in Biblioteca Nacional de Portugal, F. G. 11008

"Past the Moluccas and the islands of Banda, to the north before China is one very large and good [island], abundant with many provisions, which is called Solor, populated by gentiles, men nearly white and well-proportioned. They have a gentile king and their own language. On which island there is much gold, found in the ground, and around it the inhabitants gather many pearls, perfect in colour but not in roundness, and thus they gather many pearls of the same quality."

=== Maritime power ===
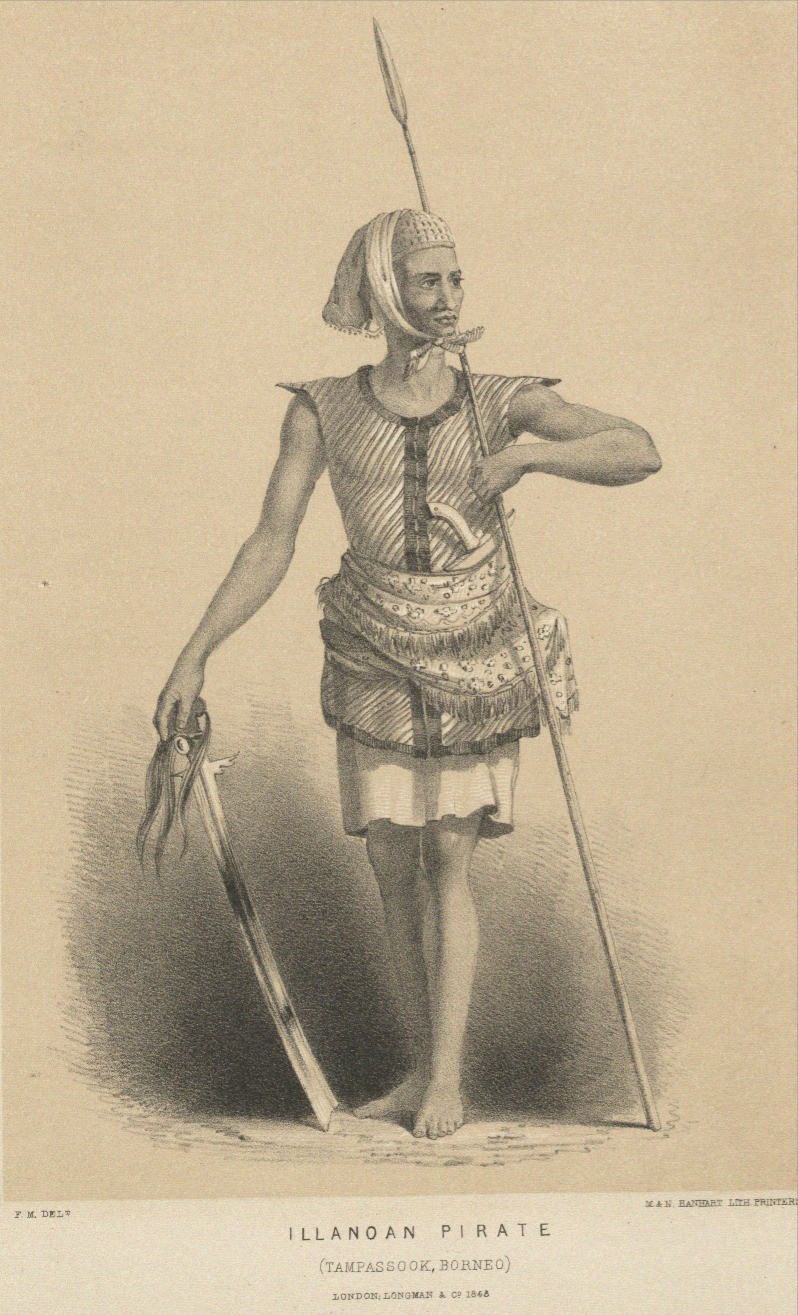
An Iranun pirate.

The Sulu sultanate became notorious for its so-called "Moro Raids" or acts of piracy on Spanish settlements in the Visayan areas in Northern Philippines and from coastal and river villages in North Borneo (Sabah), with the aim of capturing natives to be sold at slave markets in the Sulu Island (Jolo Island) and Tawi Tawi Island. Tausug pirates used boats known collectively by Europeans as proas (predominantly the lanong and garay warships), which varied in design and were much lighter than the Spanish galleons and could easily out-sail these ships, and also often carried large swivel guns or lantaka and also carried a crew of pirates from different ethnic groups throughout Sulu, such as the Iranun, Bajaus and Tausugs alike. By the 18th century, Sulu pirates had become virtual masters of the Sulu seas and the surrounding areas, wreaking havoc and conducting raids to kidnap natives living in Spanish and Brunei North Borneo settlements for the slave trade. This prompted the Spaniards to build a number of fortifications across the Visayan islands of Cebu and Bohol; churches were built on higher ground, and watchtowers were built along coastlines to warn of impending raids.

The maritime supremacy of Sulu was not directly controlled by the sultan; independent datus and warlords waged their own wars against the Spaniards and even with the capture of Jolo on numerous occasions by the Spaniards, other settlements like Maimbung, Banguingui and Tawi-Tawi were used as assembly areas and hideouts for pirates.

The sultanate's control over the Sulu seas was at its height around the late 17th to early 18th centuries when Moro raids became very common for the Borneo natives, Visayans and Spaniards.

In Sulu and in the Mindanao interior, the slave trade flourished and majority of the slaves that were being imported and exported were of Visayan ethnicity; the term Bisaya eventually became synonymous to "slave" in these areas. Its maritime supremacy over the Spaniards, at the time, the Spaniards acquired steam-powered ships that began to curb Muslim piracy in the region, the Moro piratical raids began to decrease in number until Governor Narciso Clavería launched the Balanguingui expedition in 1848 to crush the pirate settlements there, effectively ending the Moro pirate raids. By the last quarter of the 19th century, Moro pirates had virtually disappeared and the maritime influence of the sultanate became dependent on the Chinese junk trade. The piracy and slave trade was brought to an end by the Spanish who destroyed the Sulu Sultanate in 1878 with a formal surrender and capitulation of the Sultanate once and for all. Once the Americans arrived, further attempts at resurrection to their old piracy ways were put down swiftly.

=== Conquest of Northeastern Borneo ===
18th century flag of the Sultanate of Sulu according to explorer Pierre Sonnerat.

In 1746, Sultan Azim ud-Din I, with Spanish assistance, carried out punitive expeditions around the Sebuku region against the Tidungs to reconsolidate his power in Borneo. By April 1747, the expeditions were declared a success and the chief of Tarakan declared his allegiance to Sulu. After the Sultan returned to Sulu, he brought back 50 captives who were previously under the hands of the Tidung and among them was a friar, while others were Tidung chiefs. Two of the Tidung chiefs were left in Jolo while the rest were brought to Zamboanga. Tausug traders began settling in Tarakan. However, things began to complicate after the Tidungs made a political marriage with Bulungan, placing the Tidungs also under the Sultanate of Bulungan.

In 1789, amidst the civil war in Berau, Sultan Azim ud-Din II raided Berau and Tarakan, which led to the de facto independence of Bulungan from Berau by the 18th-19th century. Sulu became a dominant power in the region, bringing Bulungan, in present-day North Kalimantan, Indonesia, within its sphere of influence. Tausug trading vessels subsequently arrived in increasing numbers, highlighting the historical importance of the maritime routes connecting Indonesia's northeastern Borneo coast with the wider Sulu Archipelago. The status of Bulungan as a subject of Sulu however would later change after they stopped paying tribute to Sulu in 1855. This would later become official after the British annexation of North Borneo and the Dutch annexation of Bulungan in 1878.

In the 18th century, Sulu's dominion covered most of northeastern part of Borneo. However areas like Tempasuk and Abai had never really shown much allegiance to its earlier ruler, Brunei, subsequently similar treatment was given to Sulu. Alexander Dalrymple, who made a treaty of allegiance in 1761 with Sulu, had to make a similar agreement with the rulers of Tempasuk and Abai on the north Borneo coast in 1762. The Sultanate of Sulu totally gave up its domain over Palawan to Spain in 1705 and Basilan to Spain in 1762. The territory ceded to Sulu by Brunei initially stretched south to Tapean Durian (now Tanjong Mangkalihat) (another source mentioned a southernmost boundary at Dumaring), near the Straits of Macassar (now Kalimantan). From 1726 to 1733, the Sulu sultanate restarted their tributary relationship with China, now the Qing Empire, about 300 years after it had ended.

By 1849, the areas gained from Brunei had been effectively controlled by the Sultanate of Bulungan in Kalimantan, reducing the boundary of Sulu to a cape named Batu Tinagat and the Tawau River.

=== Decline under Spanish and American control ===
Concession of Sabah

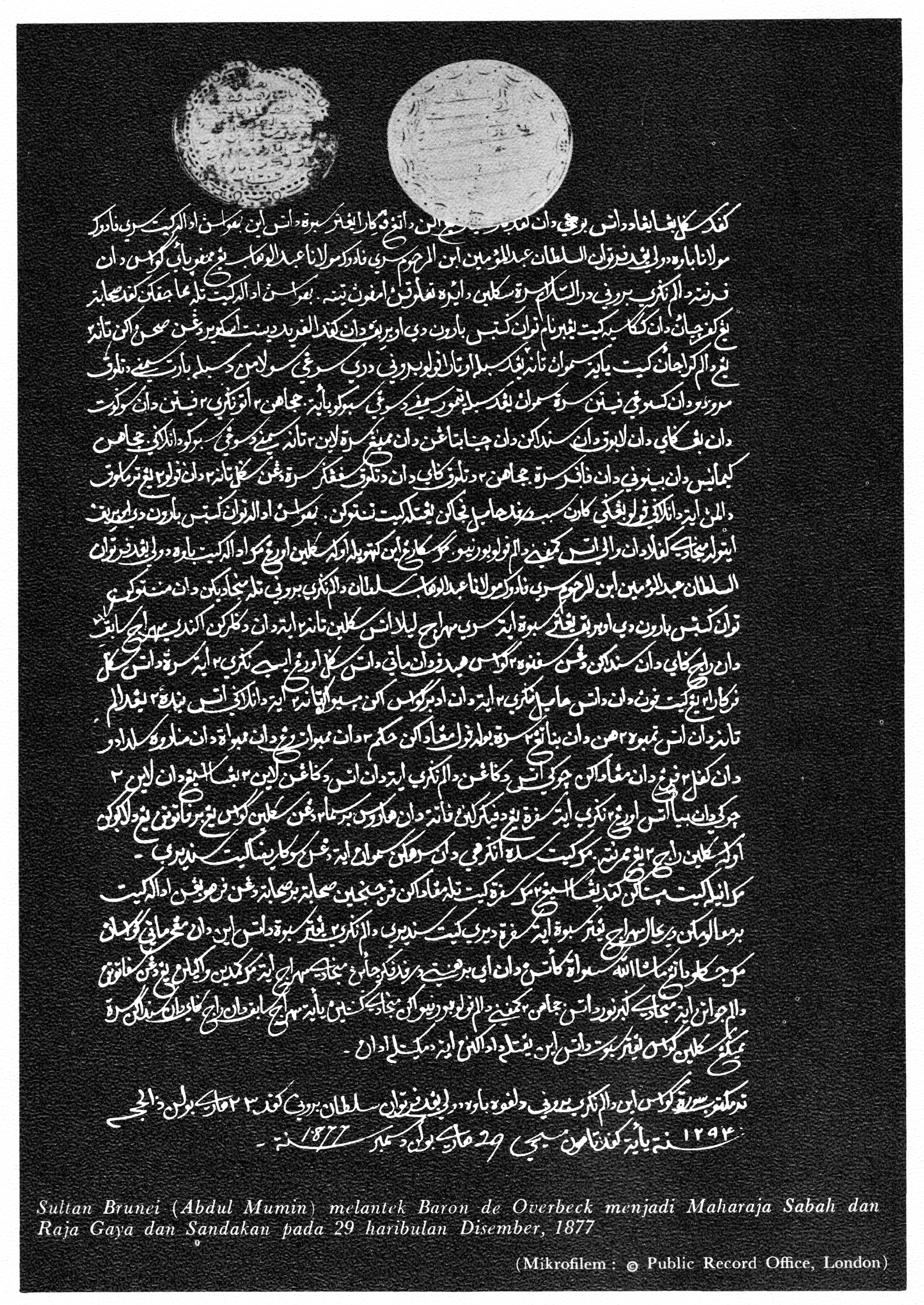
The first concession treaty was signed by Sultan Abdul Momin of Brunei on 29 December 1877, appointing Baron de Overbeck as the Maharaja Sabah, Rajah Gaya and Sandakan

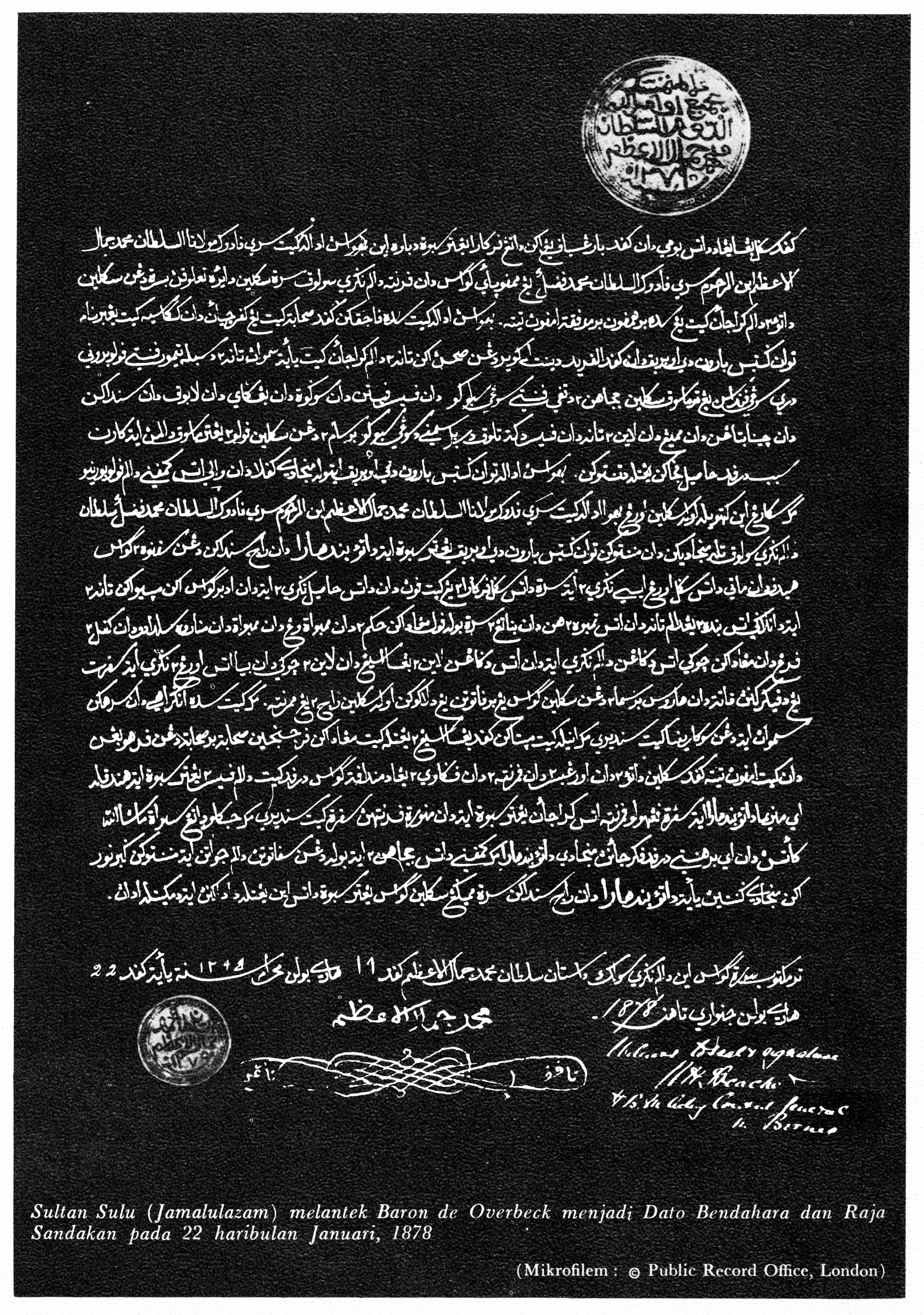
The second concession treaty was signed by Sultan Jamal ul-Azam of Sulu on 22 January 1878 also appointing Baron de Overbeck as Dato Bendahara and Raja Sandakan

In 1848 and 1851, the Spanish launched attacks on Balanguingui and Jolo respectively. A peace treaty was signed on 30 April 1851 (Note: see text of treaty (in Spanish),) in which the sultan could only regain the capital if Sulu and its dependencies became a part of the Philippine Islands under the sovereignty of Spain. There were different understandings of this treaty; although the Spanish interpreted it as the sultan accepting Spanish sovereignty over Sulu and Tawi-Tawi, but the sultan took it as a friendly treaty amongst equals. These areas were only partially controlled by the Spanish, and their power was limited to military stations and garrisons and pockets of civilian settlements. This lasted until they had to abandon the region as a consequence of their defeat in the Spanish–American War.

On 22 January 1878, an agreement was signed between Sulu and businessman Gustav Overbeck, who would later establish the North Borneo Chartered Company, granting Overbeck total control over the sultan's lands in northeastern Borneo, a region known as Sabah. The ambiguity in the treaty of whether this was a cession or only a lease of the territory would later lead to the North Borneo dispute.

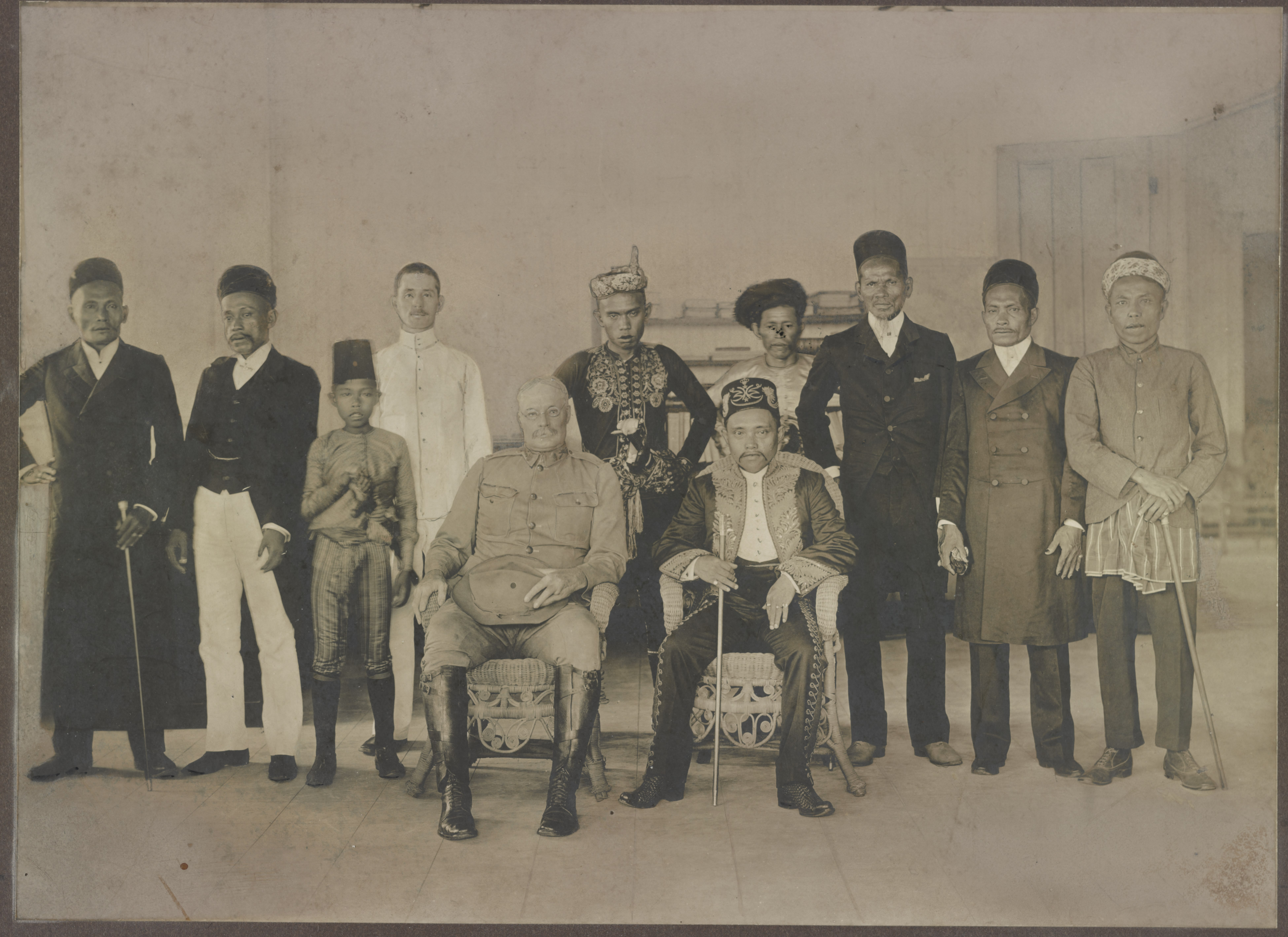
American military governor Hugh Lenox Scott meeting Jamalul Kiram II (c. 1905)

Following the defeat of the Moro Rebellion, the Sultanate of Sulu's existence effectively ceased on 22 March 1915, when American commanders demanded Sultan Jamalul Kiram II signed an agreement called the Carpenter Agreement. By this agreement, the sultan relinquished all sovereignty over territory then under control of the United States, retaining only his religious authority as head of Islam in Sulu.

==== Aftermath ====
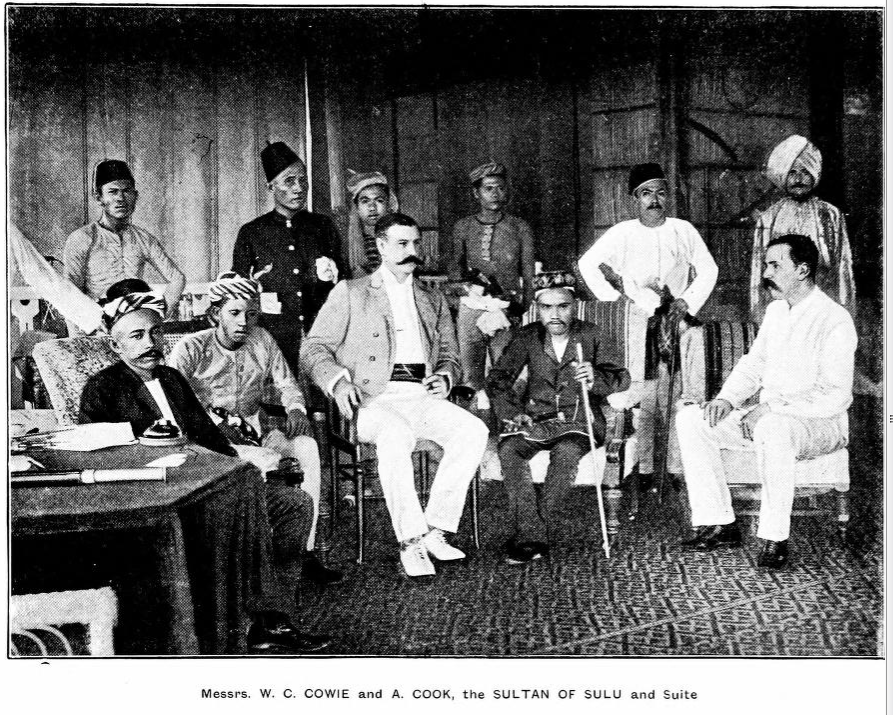
W. C. Cowie, managing director of BNBC, with the sultan of Sulu.

As a result of the language used in the treaty signed in 1878 to approve Sulu's cession of the eastern part of Sabah, a territorial dispute emerged between the Philippines and Malaysia, known as the North Borneo dispute. The English version states Sultan Jamal ul-Azam ceded the region in exchange for annual payments, whereas the Malay version has the term pajakkan, which some interpret as lease. Using the former interpretation, the British protectorate of North Borneo was formed in 1881, later becoming part of Malaysia in 1963 under the name of Sabah. The Philippines, acting as the successor state of Sulu, has claimed Sabah as its territory based on the idea that Sulu only rented the region.

Malaysia views the dispute as a "non-issue", as it not only considers the agreement in 1878 as one of cession later confirmed in a 1903 agreement, but it also deems that the residents had exercised their act of self-determination when they joined to form the Malaysian federation in 1963. It stood by the contract until 2013, issuing annual cheques in the amount of RM5,300 (approx. ₱77,000 or US$1,710) to the legal counsel of the heirs of Jamalul Kiram II, the last sovereign sultan of Sulu.

The heirs to the Sulu royals have also staked their claims to Sabah. In 2013, during the Lahad Datu standoff, a group of armed individuals sent by one of the claimants to the Sulu throne, Jamalul Kiram III, arrived in Lahad Datu, Sabah, in an attempt to assert their territorial claim. A total of 72 people were killed in the incident, which led Malaysia to suspend the annuities. Seven of the invaders were later sentenced to death.

The suspension of the annual fees led the Sulu heirs to sue Malaysia for breach of contract. Their use of forum shopping led to an initial award of at least US$14.92 billion by a Paris arbitration court. After litigation in Spanish, French, and Dutch court systems, Malaysia obtained consistent victories, culminating in a dismissal by the French Court of Cassation on 6 November 2024.

== Economy ==
=== Weapons and slave trade ===
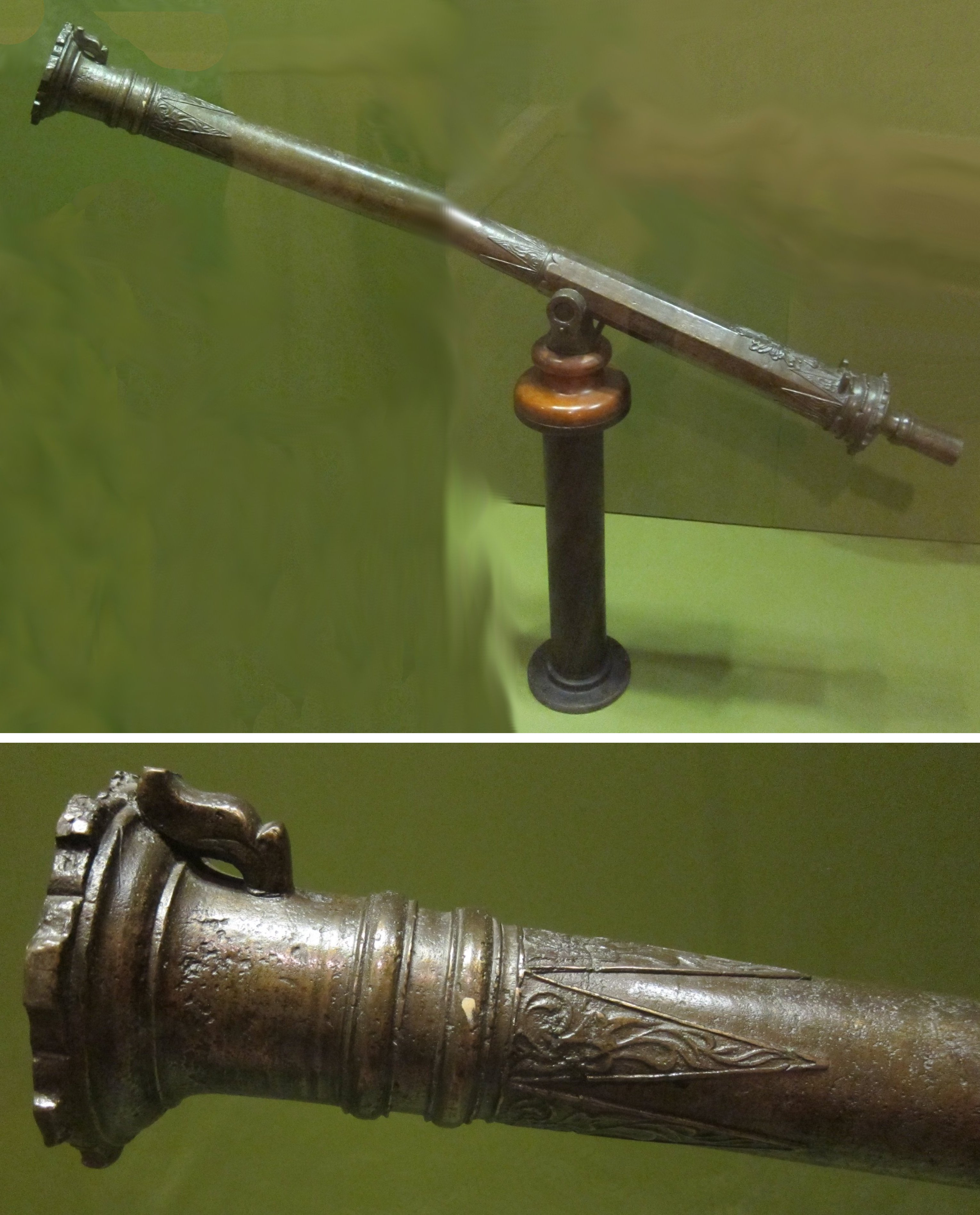
A Moro brass lantaka or swivel gun.

Chinese who lived in Sulu ran guns across a Spanish blockade to supply the Moro datus and sultanates with weapons to fight the Spanish, who were engaging in a campaign to subjugate the Moro sultanates on Mindanao. A trade involving the Moros selling slaves and other goods in exchange for guns developed. The Chinese had entered the economy of the sultanate, taking almost total control of the sultanate's economies in Mindanao and dominating the markets. Though the sultans did not like one group of people exercising exclusive control over the economy, they did business with them.

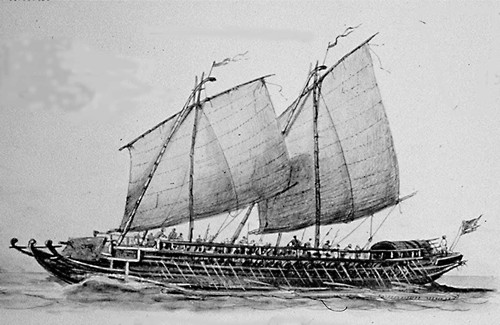
19th century illustration of a lanong, the main warships used by the Iranun and Banguingui people of the navies of the sultanates of Sulu and Maguindanao for piracy and slave raids

The Chinese set up a trading network between Singapore, Zamboanga, Jolo and Sulu. The Chinese sold small arms like Enfield and Spencer Rifles to the Buayan Datu Uto. They were used to battle the Spanish invasion of Buayan. The datu paid for the weapons in slaves. The population of Chinese in Mindanao in the 1880s was 1,000. The Chinese ran guns across a Spanish blockade to sell to Mindanao Moros. The purchases of these weapons were paid for by the Moros in slaves in addition to other goods. The main group of people selling guns were the Chinese in Sulu. The Chinese took control of the economy and used steamers to ship goods for exporting and importing. Opium, ivory, textiles, and crockery were among the other goods which the Chinese sold.

The Chinese on Maimbung sent the weapons to the Sulu sultanate, who used them to battle the Spanish and resist their attacks. A Chinese-Mestizo was one of the sultan's brothers-in-law, the sultan was married to his sister. He and the sultan both owned shares in the ship (named the Far East) which helped smuggle the weapons. The Spanish launched a surprise offensive under Colonel Juan Arolas in April 1887 by attacking the sultanate's capital at Maimbung in an effort to crush resistance. Weapons were captured and the property of the Chinese were destroyed while the Chinese were deported to Jolo.

=== Pearling industry ===
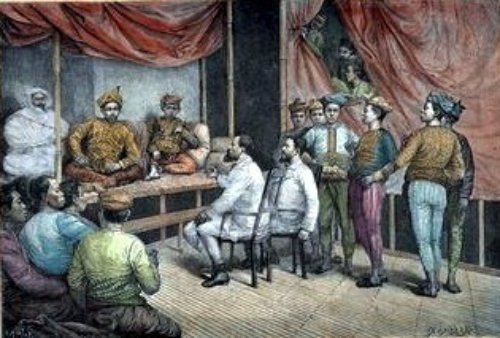
A painting from 1880s depicting Sultan Jamal ul-Azam having a conversation with French visitors.

After the destruction of the pirate haunts of Balanguingui effectively ending the centuries of slave raids, which the Sulu sultanate's economy had so depended on, along with the economy of mainland Mindanao, the sultanate's economy experienced a sharp decline as slaves became more inaccessible and the islands' agricultural produce wasn't enough, thus it became dependent on the Mindanao interior even for rice and produce. Although the Spaniards thought they had dealt the death blow for the sultanate when they captured Jolo in 1876, rather, the sultanate's capital and economic and trading hub was moved to Maimbung on the other side of the island. Up until the American occupation, this was the residence and economic center of Sulu. This is where the Sultan Jamalul Kiram II and his adviser Hadji Butu began the Sulu pearling industry to increase the sultan's wealth, they organized the Sulu pearling fleet, which remained active well into the early 20th century. In 1910, the sultan reportedly sold a giant pearl in London for $100,000.

== Culture ==
=== Social class system ===
Among the people of the Sultanate of Sulu, nobility could be acquired only by lineage, a closed hereditary system.

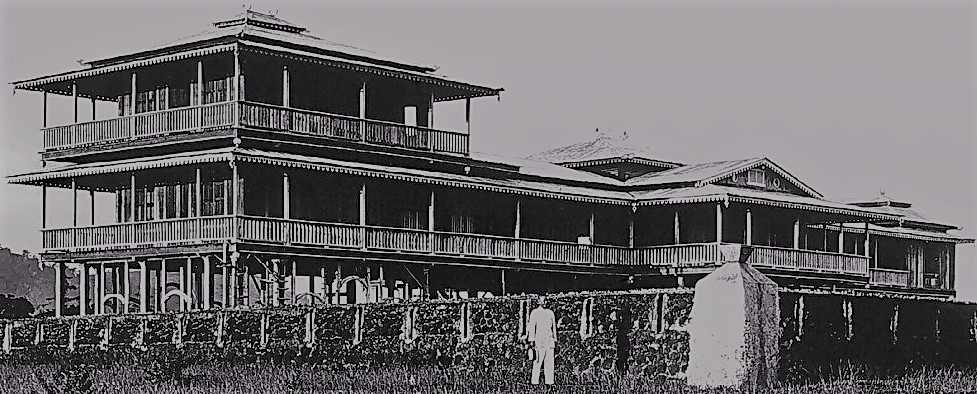
Darul Jambangan (Palace of Flowers) in Maimbung, last residence to the sultans.

There were two royal classes:

- Datu (susultanun), acquired purely by lineage. All male members of the royal house of Sulu held this title and style "His Royal Highness (HRH)". Their spouses automatically held the title of Dayangdayang (princess of the first degree). Adopted members of the royal house of Sulu were styled "His Highness (HH)" and their spouses also held the title of Dayangdayang and the style: "Her Highness".
- Datu sadja, which may be acquired through confirming the titles (gullal) on the middleman of the sultan. The gullal is made if a commoner has achieved outstanding feats or services in line of duty through display of bravery, heroism, etc. Datu sadja is a life title of nobility and the title holders hold the style "His Excellency" and their spouses should hold the title of dayang the style "Her Excellency".

Maharlika, or commoners, do not trace their descent from royalty. The upper subclasses held administrative roles:

- Wakil Kesultanan – regional representative outside the sultanate
- Panglima – regional representative inside the sultanate
- Parkasa – aide-de-camp of region representative inside the sultanate
- Laksaman– subregional representative inside the sultanate

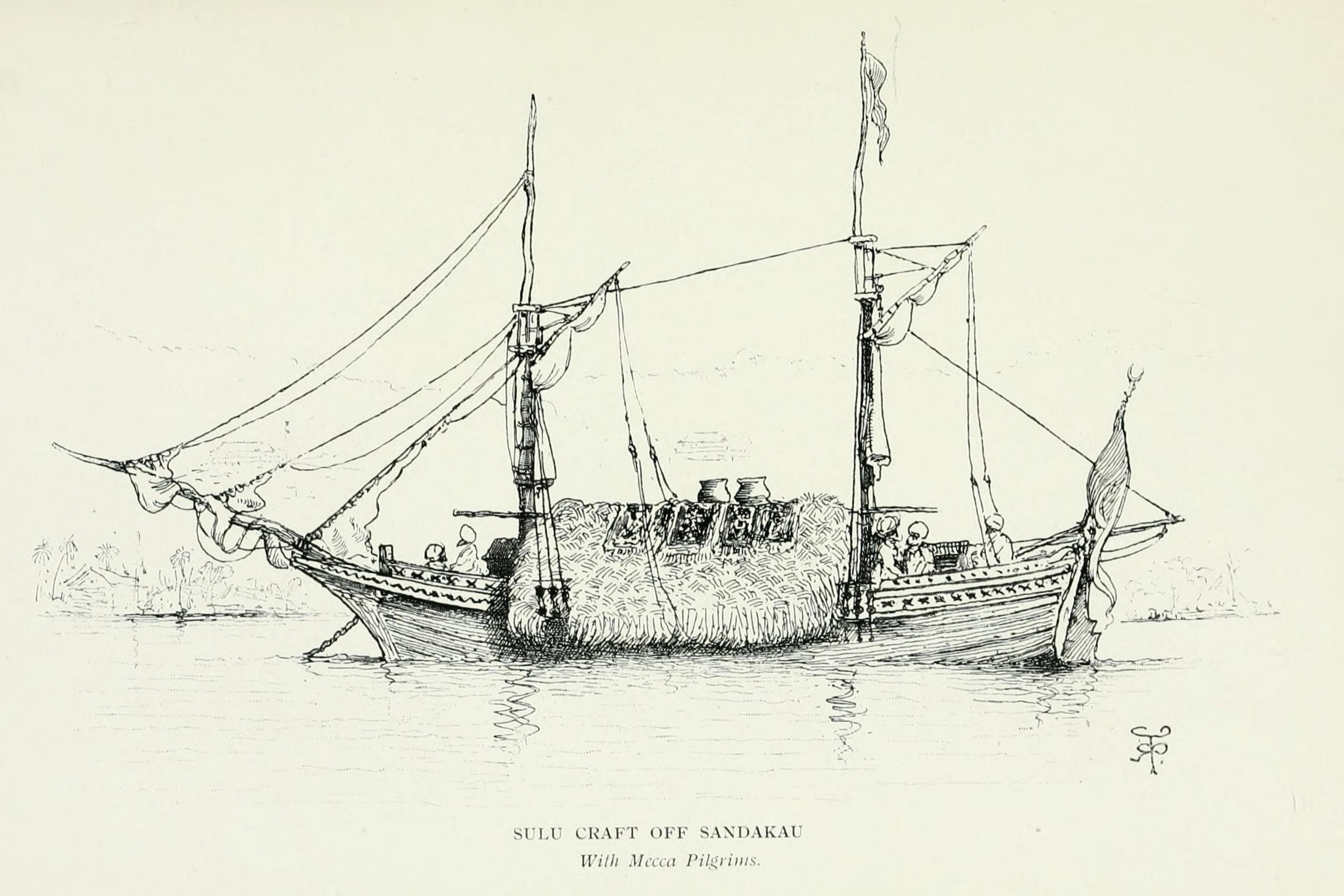
Sulu vessel carrying pilgrims to Mecca, 1899.

The men who hold the offices above were addressed by the title of nobility Tuan (the title is directly attached to the office), followed by the rank of the office they hold, their given name, surname and region. The women who held offices above shall be addressed by the title of nobility Sitti (the title is directly attached to the office), followed by the same name order.

A very large part of the Sulu society, as well as in the Sultanate of Maguindanao were slaves captured from slave raids or bought from slave markets. They were known as the bisaya, reflecting their most common origin – Christianized Visayans from Spanish territories in the Philippines – although they also included captured slaves from other ethnic groups throughout Southeast Asia. They were also known as banyaga, ipun, or ammas. It is estimated that as much as 50% of the population of Sulu in the 1850s were bisaya slaves and dominated the Sulu economy. For the most part, they were treated like commoners, with their own houses and were responsible for cultivating farms and fisheries of Tausug nobility. But there were harsh punishments for attempts to escape, and a large number of the slaves were sold to European, Chinese, Makassar, and Bugis slavers in the Dutch East Indies.

=== Visual arts ===
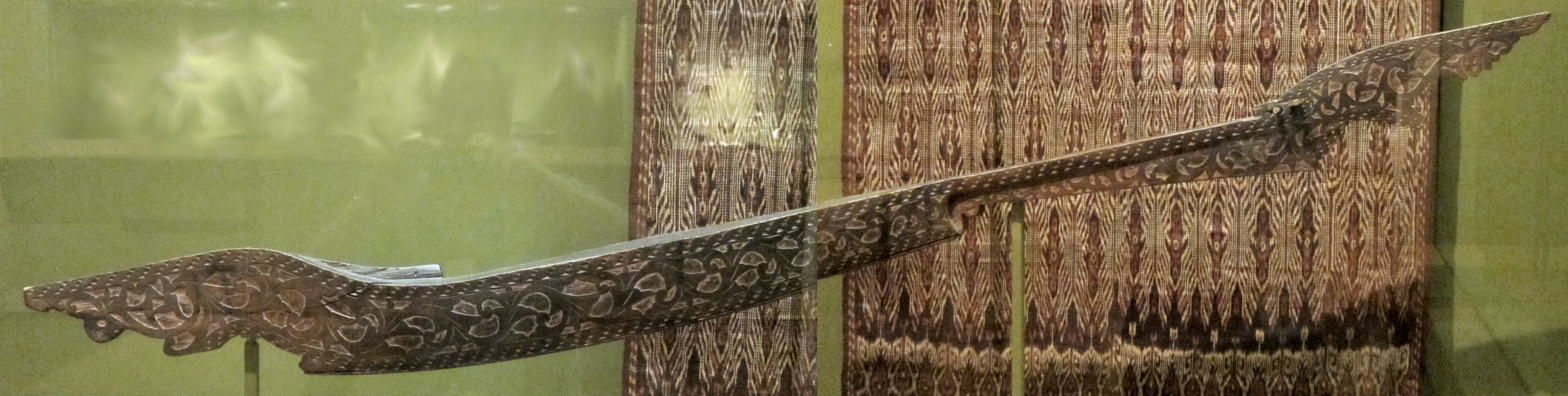
A kutiyapi (lute) from Mindanao bearing Ukkil motifs.

The Sultanate of Sulu, along with the rest of Mindanao, has a long tradition of decorative arts known as ukkil or okir. Ukkil is the Tausug word for "wood carving" or "engraving". The Tausug and Maranao peoples traditionally carved and decorated their boats, houses and even grave markers with ukkil carvings. Aside from wood carvings, ukkil motifs were found on various clothing in the Sulu archipelago. Ukkil motifs tend to emphasise geometric patterns and a flowing design, with floral and leaf patterns as well as folk elements. The Tausug also decorated their weapons with these motifs, and various kris and barong blades have finely decorated handles as well as blades covered in floral patterns and the like. Bronze lantaka also bear some ukkil patterns.

== See also ==
- Sultanate of Malacca
- Sultanate of Maguindanao
- John C. Bates
- Manila Accord
- Abolition of monarchy
- Hinduism in the Philippines
- History of the Philippines (Before 1521)
- Kiram-Bates Treaty
