= Darul Jambangan =

- دَرُلْ جَمْبَڠَنْ
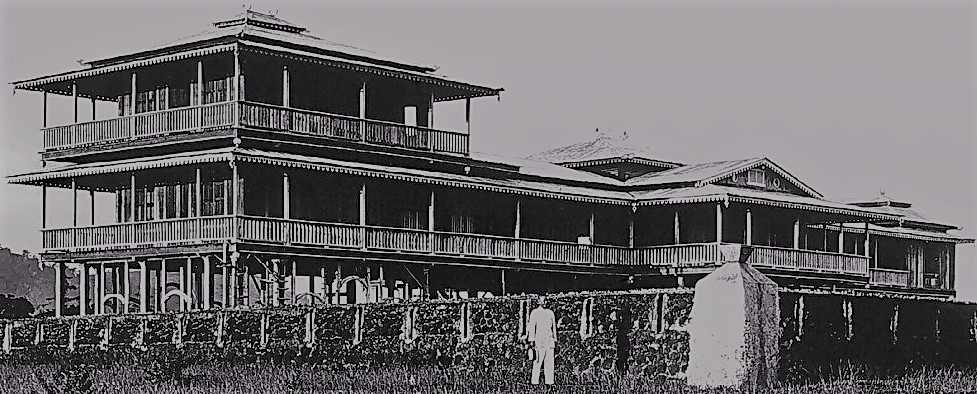

General information
- Status: Destroyed
- Type: Palace
- Architectural style: Nipa hut
- Location: Maimbung, Sulu, Philippines
- Destroyed: 1932 (by a typhoon)
- Client: Sultanate of Sulu

Technical details
- Material: Wood
- Floor count: 3

The Darul Jambangan (Palace of Flowers) was the palace of the Sultanate of Sulu (i.e., the Tausug Sultanate) based in Maimbung, Sulu, Philippines in 1886. It was said to have been the largest royal palace in the Philippines.

The three-story building was destroyed by a typhoon on April 28, 1932. It remains in ruins as of 2022, with only two stone pillars standing. Fortunately, the Maimbung Municipal Government Office in Maimbung, Sulu, led by the Honorable Mayor Shihla A. Tan-Hayudini restored the palace in October 2022. Now, it has become a tourism landmark for locals and foreigners visiting the rich cultural background of Bangsa Sug.
