= Maimbung =

Municipality in Sulu, Philippines

Maimbung مَئِمْبُڠْ
- Municipality
- Municipality of Maimbung
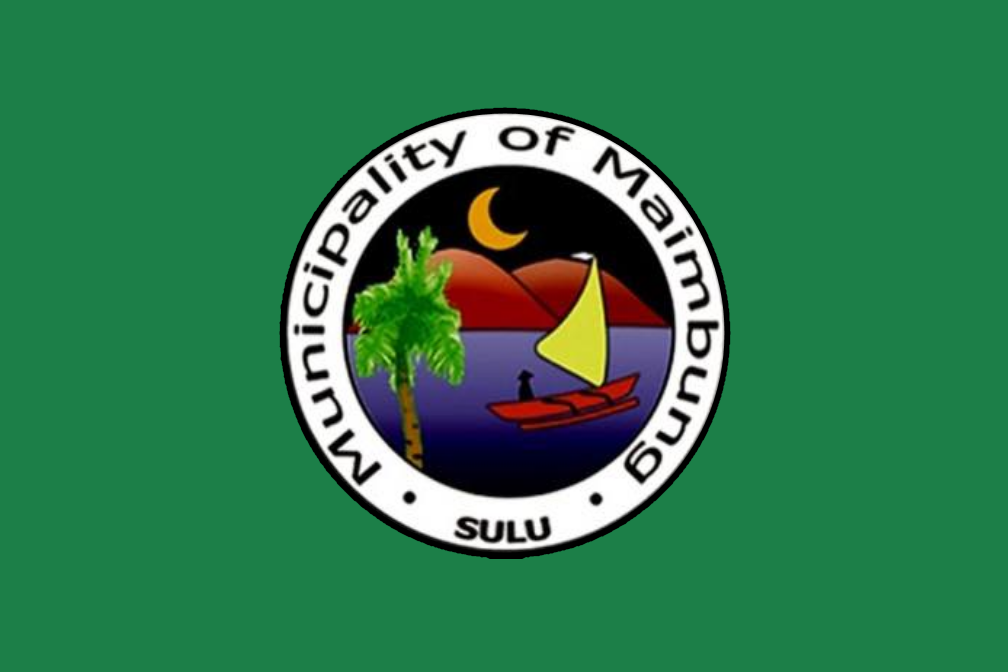
- Flag

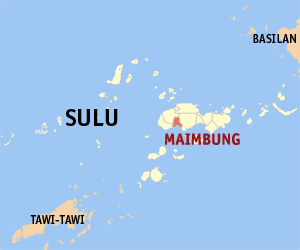
- Map of Sulu with Maimbung highlighted
- Interactive map of Maimbung
- Location within the Philippines
- Coordinates: 5°56′N 121°02′E
- Country: Philippines
- Region: Zamboanga Peninsula
- Province: Sulu
- District: 1st district
- Barangays: 27 (see Barangays)

Government
  - Type: Sangguniang Bayan
  - Mayor: Shihla T. Hayudini
  - Vice Mayor: Aiman T. Tan
  - Representative: Samier A. Tan
  - Municipal Council: Members: Abubakar D. Tan; Mervin A. Arajil; Ahmadjan M. Hassan; Almudzni T. Amil; Alisa M. Arah; Absar A. Arjalil; Hatta J. Tiblan; Annuar A. Usman
  - Electorate: 37,468 voters (2025)

Area
  - Total: 77.50 km^{2} (29.92 sq mi)
- Elevation: 49 m (161 ft)
- Highest elevation: 391 m (1,283 ft)
- Lowest elevation: 0 m (0 ft)

Population (2024 census)
  - Total: 85,681
  - Density: 1,106/km^{2} (2,863/sq mi)
  - Households: 10,130

Economy
  - Income class: 2nd municipal income class
  - Poverty incidence: 19.59% (2023)
  - Revenue: ₱ 219.1 million (2022)
  - Assets: ₱ 668.4 million (2022)
  - Expenditure: ₱ 142.5 million (2022)
  - Liabilities: ₱ 413.7 million (2022)

Service provider
  - Electricity: Sulu Electric Cooperative (SULECO)
- Time zone: UTC+8 (PST)
- ZIP code: 7409
- PSGC: 1906605000
- IDD : area code: +63 (0)68
- Native languages: Tausug; Tagalog

Maimbung, officially the Municipality of Maimbung (Tausug: Kawman sin Maimbung; Tagalog: Bayan ng Maimbung), is a municipality in the province of Sulu, Philippines. According to the 2024 census, it has a population of 85,681 people.

It was the seat of the Sultanate of Sulu.

== History ==
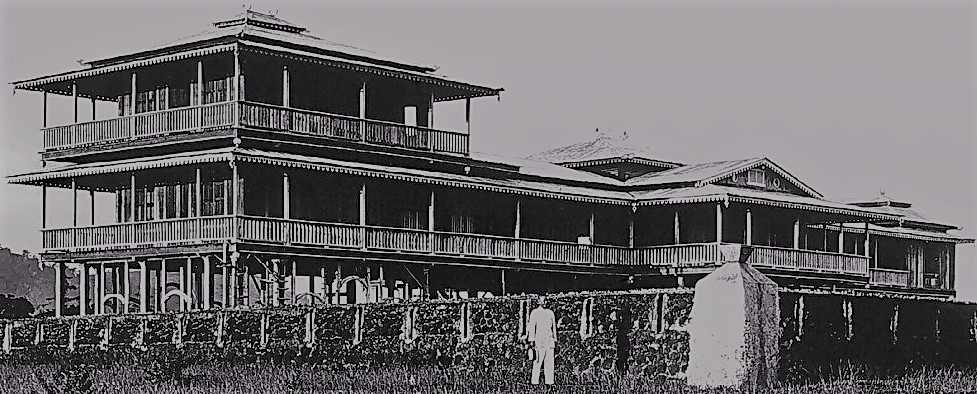
Daru Jambangan (Palace of Flowers) before it was destroyed by a typhoon.

The town hosted the Daru Jambangan (Palace of Flowers) which was the royal palace of the Sultan of Sulu since historical times. The palace was made of wood, and was destroyed in 1932 by a huge storm. Today, a few arches and posts remain from the once grand palace complex. Many members of the royal family advocated for the reconstruction of the palace, and even its enlargement, however, the government of the Philippines has yet to establish a position or a fund for the matter.

The town was officially cited by the late Sultan Jamalul Kiram III of the Sultanate of Sulu as the capital of the sultanate, and the place where he wished he was buried after death. The late sultan died in 2013 and was buried in the town afterwards. The town hosts a school named after the late sultan.

In 2016, a small replica of Daru Jambangan was built in the neighboring town of Talipao and became a centerpiece for a 'vacation park'. The replica was about 25% of the actual size of the real Daru Jambangan during its heyday. A campaign to restore the Daru Jambanagn in its original location in Maimbung is still ongoing. The National Commission for Culture and the Arts and the National Museum of the Philippines were tasked to faithfully restore or reconstruct the Daru Jambangan in Maimbung.

== Geography ==
=== Barangays ===
Maimbung is politically subdivided into 27 barangays. Each barangay consists of puroks while some have sitios.

- Anak Jati
- Bato Ugis
- Bualo Lahi
- Bualo Lipid
- Bulabog
- Duhol Kabbon
- Gulangan
- Ipil
- Kandang
- Kapok-Punggol
- Kulasi
- Labah
- Lagasan Asibih
- Lantong
- Lapa
- Laud Kulasi
- Laum Maimbung
- Lower Tambaking
- Lunggang
- Matatal
- Patao
- Poblacion (Maimbung)
- Ratag Limbon
- Tabu-Bato
- Tandu Patong
- Tubig-Samin
- Upper Tambaking

=== Climate ===
Maimbung has a consistently very warm to hot, oppressively humid, and wet tropical rainforest climate (Köppen Af).

Climate data for Maimbung, Sulu
Month	Jan	Feb	Mar	Apr	May	Jun	Jul	Aug	Sep	Oct	Nov	Dec	Year
Mean daily maximum °C (°F)	27 (81)	27 (81)	27 (81)	28 (82)	28 (82)	28 (82)	28 (82)	28 (82)	28 (82)	28 (82)	28 (82)	28 (82)	28 (82)
Mean daily minimum °C (°F)	27 (81)	26 (79)	27 (81)	27 (81)	28 (82)	28 (82)	28 (82)	28 (82)	28 (82)	28 (82)	27 (81)	27 (81)	27 (81)
Average rainfall mm (inches)	170 (6.7)	130 (5.1)	125 (4.9)	122 (4.8)	229 (9.0)	286 (11.3)	254 (10.0)	248 (9.8)	182 (7.2)	257 (10.1)	233 (9.2)	188 (7.4)	2,424 (95.5)
Average rainy days	18.3	15.3	15.2	14.6	22.8	24.0	24.3	23.3	20.5	22.6	21.9	19.3	242.1
Source: Meteoblue (modeled/calculated data, not measured locally)

== Demographics ==
Population census of Maimbung
Year	Pop.	±% p.a.
1903	1,070	—
1918	7,339	+13.70%
1939	11,228	+2.05%
1948	12,456	+1.16%
1960	14,302	+1.16%
1970	15,557	+0.84%
1975	17,166	+1.99%
1980	20,080	+3.18%
1990	17,251	−1.51%
1995	21,692	+4.39%
2000	24,982	+3.07%
2007	38,092	+5.99%
2010	28,445	−10.08%
2015	37,914	+5.63%
2020	59,597	+9.99%
2024	85,681	+9.11%
Source: Philippine Statistics Authority

== Economy ==
Poverty Incidence of Maimbung

Source: Philippine Statistics Authority

The town is one of the three official ports of the province of Sulu, the other two being Jolo and Siasi. The town is also a known producer of seaweed, a major export product of the Sulu archipelago.
