= Royal house of Sulu =

Islamic royal house that ruled the Sulu Sultanate

House of Kiram
- Country: Sultanate of Sulu
- Founded: 1823
- Founder: Jamalul Kiram I
- Current head: Disputed: Muedzul Lail Tan Kiram; Phugdalun Kiram II; Fuad Abdullah Kiram; and others
- Titles: Sultan of Sulu

The House of Kiram is an Islamic royal house which ruled the Sultanate of Sulu (now part of the Philippines, Indonesia, and Malaysia). It is a cadet branch of the house consisting of descendants of Sharif ul Hashim, the first sultan. The House of Kiram descends from Jamalul Kiram I, who was sultan of Sulu from 1823 to 1844.

Muedzul Lail Tan Kiram, one of the disputed heads of the house of Kiram and claimant to the title of Sultan of Sulu, was crowned in an event on the island of Jolo on 16 September 2012.

== List of members ==
A list of the family members related to Muedzul Lail Tan Kiram is as follows:

- Ampun Sultan Muedzul Lail Tan Kiram
  Ampun Babai Dayang Dayang Mellany S. Kiram
  - Raja Muda Moh. Ehsn S. Kiram (Sultan's eldest son)
  - Datu Nizamuddin S. Kiram
  - Dayang Dayang Rahela S. Kiram
  - Datu Jihad S. Kiram
  - Datu Mujahid S. Kiram
  - Dayang Dayang Redha S. Kiram
  - Datu Mahakuttah S. Kiram
- The Ampun Sultan Muedzul Lail Tan Kiram's sisters and brothers and their spouses:
  - Dayang Dayang Zuharra T. Kiram Mohammad
    Mr. Hadji Pyzar Mohammad
  - Dayang Dayang Dinwasa T. Kiram Delos-Santos
    Mr. Noel Delos-Santos
  - Datu Yldon Tan Kiram
    Dayang Dayang Myrla Sacapanyo Kiram
  - Dayang Dayang Nur Mahal T. Kiram
  - Dayang Dayang Ayesha T. Kiram
  - Dayang Dayang Tanya Rowena T. Kiram
- The Ampun Sultan Muedzul Lail Tan Kiram's uncles and aunts and their spouses:
  - Dayang Dayang Jamdatul Kiram (widow of the Ampun Sultan Muedzul Lail Tan Kiram's uncle HRH Datu Iskader A. Kiram)
  - Datu Fuad Abdulla Kiram
    Dayang Dayang Emelee Kiram
  - Dayang Dayang Parmaisuli A. Kiram-Guerzon

== See also ==
- Princess Tarhata Kiram
- List of sultans of Sulu
