= List of sultans of Sulu =

Sultan of Sulu
- سُلْتَنْ سِنْ سُوْݢْ (Tausug); Sultan sin Sūg
- Flag of the Sultanate of Sulu

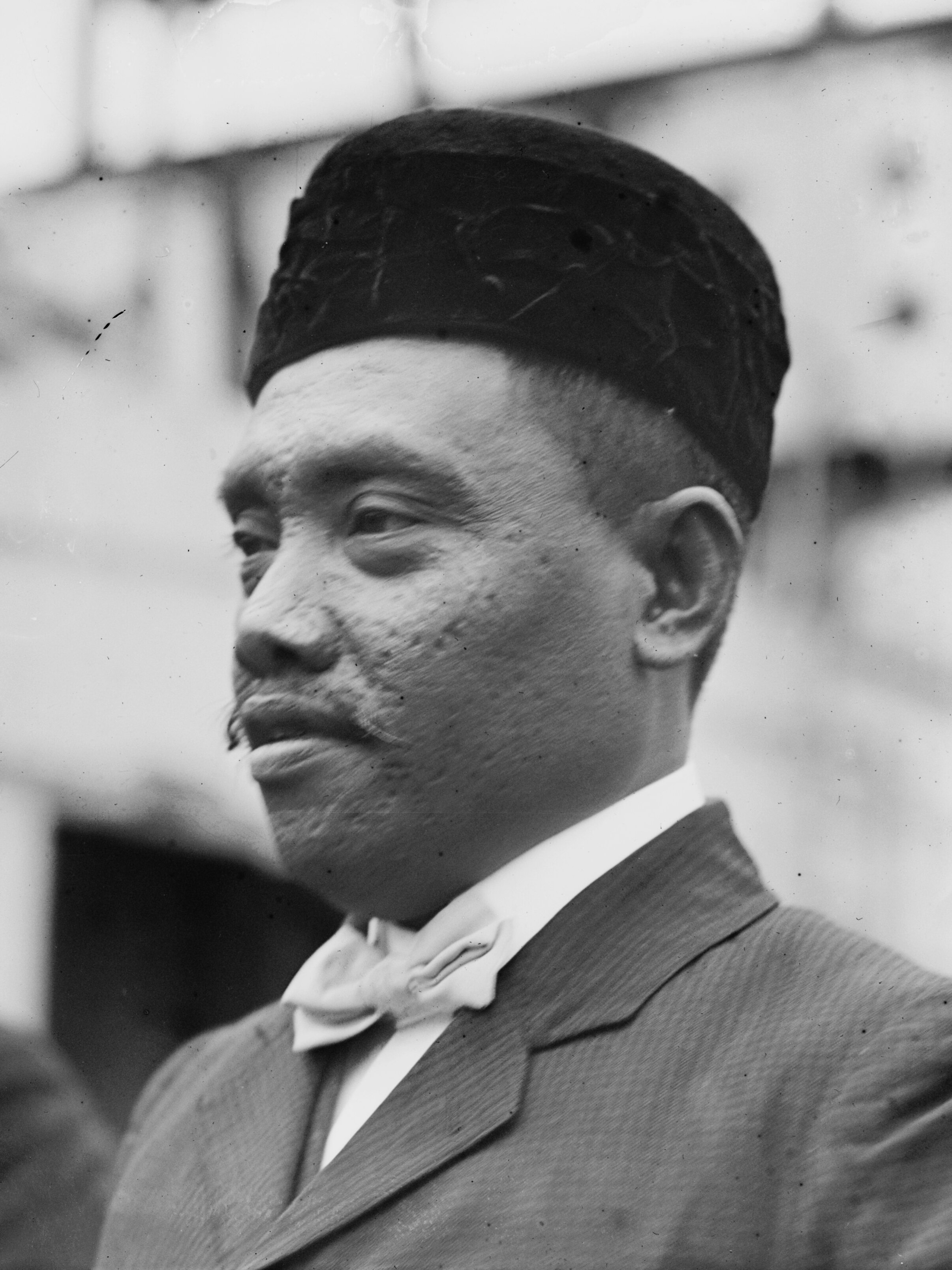
- Last sovereign ruler Jamalul Kiram II; 22 February 1894 – 22 March 1915

Details
- Style: Paduka Mahasari Maulana al-Sultan (Note: Arabic: فادك مهاسري مولانا السلطان, romanized: Fāduka Mahāsrī Maūlānā al-Sulṭān, lit. 'The Master, His Majesty, Protector, and Sultan'. The titles are of Arabic and Sanskrit origin.)
- First monarch: Sharif ul-Hāshim
- Formed: c. 1450
- Residence: Darul Jambangan
- Appointer: Ruma Bechara (hereditary in practice)
- Pretenders: Disputed: Muedzul Lail Tan Kiram (House of Kiram); Phugdalun Kiram II (House of Kiram); Ibrahim Q. Bahjin-Shakirullah II (House of Bahjin); Muizuddin Jainal Abirin Bahjin (House of Bahjin); Mohammad Venizar Julkarnain Jainal Abirin (House of Abirin); and others

Sultans began ruling Sulu, a Sunni Muslim thalassocracy originating in today's Philippines, starting in the 15th century. Practically all of them were descended from the original sultan Sharif ul-Hāshim. The Ruma Bechara, the advisory council of Datus and Sharifs, had the responsibility of electing the next heir apparent (Raja Muda) from among the male-line heirs.

The sultanate began losing power during the 19th century, culminating in the abolition of the sultan's temporal powers in 1915. Since then, save for some instances of recognition by the Philippine government related to the North Borneo dispute, the title of sultan has carried with it no political powers or privileges and became mostly linked to non-sovereign cultural figures.

== Pre-sultanate kings ==
The island of Jolo was divided into three kingdoms before the sultanate arose. Maimbung was the oldest settlement, followed by those of the Tagimaha (western Jolo) and Baklaya people (northern Jolo).

Three kings from Sulu were recorded in Chinese annals due to their 1417 visit to the court of the Yongle Emperor.

- East King Paduka Pahala (Pāduka Bhaṭṭāra)
- West King Maharaja Kamalud Din (or Mahalachii)
- Cave (Dong) King Paduka Patulapok

Paduka Pahala, the East King and the most powerful of the three, fell ill and died during his journey. His eldest son Tumahan returned to Sulu to assume his father's throne, while two younger brothers stayed behind in China, where their descendants live to this day.

Soon after, local tradition states that Sharif ul-Hāshim arrived in Sulu and married the princess Dayang-dayang Paramisuli, daughter of local chief Rajah Baguinda, founding the Sultanate of Sulu.

== List of sultans ==
Sultans of Sulu from the 15th century to 1936
No.	Name	Reign	Life details
1	Sharif ul-Hāshim (Abu Bakr)	c. 1450 – c. 1480	Son-in-law and heir to Buansa chief Raja Baguinda.; Arab explorer and Sunni Muslim religious leader.; Divided Jolo into five districts under the authority of panglimas.; Created a code of laws based on Islamic law.; Reigned until his death.
2	Kamal ud-Din	c. 1480 – c. 1505	Son of Sharif ul-Hāshim.; Reigned until his death.
3	Alaud-Din	—N/a	Son of Sharif ul-Hāshim.; "Did not become sultan" (either immediately after his father's death or at all).; Lived with his sister Putri Sarip.
4	Amirul Umara (Diraja)	c. 1505 – c. 1527	His title is believed to come from the Arabic for "prince of princes" (amīr al-umarāʾ).; Possibly an outsider or usurper.; One local tradition claims this is Bolkiah, sultan of Brunei.
5	Muizzul Mutawadi'in (Upo)	c. 1527 – c. 1548	Described as a helper of the poor.
6	Nasir ud-Din I (Awwal)	c. 1548 – c. 1568	Surnamed Digunung or Habud, suggesting he ruled or came from Sulu's interior.
7	Muhammad ul-Halim (Pangiran Buddiman)	c. 1568 – c. 1596	Fought against Spain in the Castilian War.; Declared Sulu's independence from the Bruneian Empire in 1578.; Brother-in-law to Bruneian sultan Saiful Rijal.; Reigned until his death.
8	Batara Shah Tengah (Pangiran Tengah or Tindig)	c. 1596 – c. 1608	Contested by his cousin Abdasaloan, ruler of Basilan.; Killed in battle in Bauang by his cousin's forces.
9	Muwallil Wasit I (Rajah Bongsu)	c. 1610 – c. 1650	Possibly a son of Muhammad Hasan of Brunei, who would have installed him as sultan, and nephew to Batara Shah Tengah.; Moved the court to Tawi-Tawi during the Spanish occupation of Jolo.; Received land in North Borneo from Brunei in 1622 in exchange for help against a rebellion.; Abdicated in favor of his son Bakhtiar.
10	Nasir ud-Din II (Muhammad Kudarat?)	c. 1645 – c. 1648	Possibly Pangiran Sarikula, younger son of Muwallil Wasit I.; Another theory suggests this is Muhammad Kudarat, sultan of Maguindanao and possible son-in-law to Muwallil Wasit.
11	Salah ud-Din Bakhtiar	c. 1650 – c. 1680	Son of Muwallil Wasit I.; Known as Bactial, his birth name, by Spanish officials.; Contested his father's rule after the death of Pangiran Sarikula.; Reigned until his death.
12	Ali Shah	—N/a	Reign said to be "short and peaceful".
13	Nur ul-Azam	—N/a	Sister of Salah ud-Din.; Ruled as sultana for four or five years.
14	Al Haqunu Ibn Wali ul-Ahad	—N/a	His name is Arabic for "son of the Raja Muda" (chosen heir apparent).; Possibly the son of Pangiran Sarikula and co-ruler with his cousin Salah ud-Din.; Speculated to have been a pretender with some following.
15	Shahab ud-Din	c. 1685 – c. 1710	Son of Salah ud-Din.; Killed Sultan Kahar ud-Din Kuda of Maguindanao in 1702.; Pressured into ceding Palawan to the Spanish government in 1705.; Reigned until his death.
16	Mustafa Shafi ud-Din (Juhan Pahalawan)	c. 1710 – c. 1718	Younger brother of Shahab ud-Din.; Abdicated in favor of his brother Badarud-Din I to avoid dynastic disputes.
17	Badar ud-Din I (Dungun)	c. 1718 – 1732	Younger brother of Shafi ud-Din.; Contested by Nasar ud-Din in 1731.; Forced to retire to Tawi-Tawi, where he later died.
18	Nasar ud-Din (Dipatuan)	1732 – 1735 (3 years)	Either a son or grandson of Shahab ud-Din or a son of Badar ud-Din I.; Contested by Badar ud-Din I's son Azim ud-Din I.; Left the court for Maimbung, where he later died.; Attempted to regain the throne unsuccessfully various times.
19	Azim ud-Din I (Note: During his exile, he would convert to Christianity and be baptized as Don Fernando de Alimud Din, with the regnal name of Ferdinand I. It's unclear whether this was his genuine desire or merely a political move. He returned to his original name and religion prior to being restored to the throne.)	1735 – 1748 (1st reign; 13 years)	Son of Badar ud-Din and a Bugis lady from Sulawesi.; Proclaimed sultan by his father Badar ud-Din in Tawi-Tawi.; Signed a peace treaty in 1737 with Spanish governor Fernando de Valdés.; Formed a small army and navy, suppressing piracy.; Advocated for education, translating parts of the Quran into Tausug.; Forced into exile due to his perceived closeness with Jesuits.
20	Bantilan Muizzud-Din	1748 – 1763 (15 years)	Either a son of Shahab ud-Din or a younger brother of Azim ud-Din I.; Proclaimed himself sultan after ousting Azim ud-Din I.; Reigned until his death.
—	Azim ud-Din II	1763 – June 1764 (1st reign; 1 year)	Son of Muizzud-Din.; Reigned with his brother after his father's death.; Left for Parang after the arrival of Azim ud-Din I from exile.
—	Azim ud-Din I	June 1764 – 1774 (2nd reign; 10 years)	Reinstated by British occupiers, who freed him from Spanish captivity in Manila.; Ceded land in Borneo to the British, including Balambangan Island.; Abdicated in favor of his son Israil.
21	Muhammad Israil	1774 – 1778 (4 years)	Son of Azim ud-Din I.; Received his education in Manila, where he learned Spanish customs.; Continued his father's controversial progressive policies.; Poisoned by his cousin Azim ud-Din II, who assumed the throne.
22	Azim ud-Din II	1778 – 1791 (2nd reign; 13 years)	Reassumed the throne after his cousin's death.; Increased hostilities between Sulu and Spain.; Reigned until his death.
23	Sharaf ud-Din	1791 – 1808 (17 years)	Son of Azim ud-Din I.; Reigned until his death.
24	Azim ud-Din III	1808 (40 days)	Son of Sharapud-Din.; Reigned only for forty days until his death, probably due to a smallpox epidemic.
25	Aliyud-Din	1808 – 1821 (13 years)	Younger brother of Azim ud-Din III.; Seized the throne while Datu Bantilan, the chosen heir apparent and son of Azim ud-Din II, was absent.; Contested by Datu Bantilan, who ruled from Parang.; Reigned until his death.
26	Shakirullah	1821 – 1823 (2 years)	Younger brother of Aliyud-Din.; Considered a deeply pious ruler who sought connection with his subjects.; Reigned until his death.
27	Jamalul Kiram I	1823 – 1842 (19 years)	Son of Azim ud-Din III. Started the house of Kiram.; Strengthened commercial activity.; Reigned until his death.
28	Mohammad Pulalun Kiram	1842 – 24 September 1862 (20 years)	Son of Jamalul Kiram I.; Considered an able administrator and just ruler.; Began the Luntar or Sulu annals in 1844.; Dealt with further Spanish attacks.; Submitted to Spain, which incorporated Sulu as a protectorate in 1851.; Reigned until his death.
29	Jamal ul-Azam	1862 – 8 April 1881 (19 years)	Son of Mohammad Pulalun Kiram.; Revised the law code and conducted various public improvements.; Fought Spanish occupation and ruled through their destruction of Jolo.; Signed the cession treaties of Sabah to the North Borneo Chartered Company, the controversial wording of which would later lead to the North Borneo dispute.; Changed the royal residence to Maimbung.; Reigned until his death.
30	Badarud-Din II	April 1881 – 22 February 1884 (2 years, 10 months)	Eldest son of Jamal ul-Azam.; Reign marked by the influence of his stepmother Inchi Jamila.; Made the first recorded Hajj by a Sulu sultan.; Strengthened peace and diplomatic ties with Spain.; Reigned until his early death, which sparked a civil war.
31	Harun Ar-Rashid	24 September 1886 – 22 February 1894 (7 years, 4 months)	A descendant of Azim ud-Din I through Datu Putong.; Initially a mediator between rivals Amirul Kiram and Datu Aliyuddin.; Proclaimed sultan by the Spanish authorities.; Supported by a minority of the population, which made his rule difficult.; Forced to abdicate in favor of Amirul Kiram, the future Jamalul Kiram II.
32	Jamalul Kiram II	22 February 1894 (Note: Claimed the throne from Badarud-Din II's death in 1884.) – 7 June 1936 (Note: Titular from 22 March 1915, when he reliquished all his sovereignty to the United States government.) (42 years, 4 months)	Younger stepbrother of Badarud-Din II.; Recognized as sole sultan after Harun Ar-Rashid's abdication.; Signed the Kiram–Bates Treaty, keeping Sulu out of the Philippine–American War.; Led Sulu through the Moro Rebellion against the United States.; Deprived of his sovereignty in 1915, marking the end of the sultanate.; Retained his title until his death.

== Claimants after 1936 ==
=== Partially recognized sultans under the Philippines (1936–1986) ===
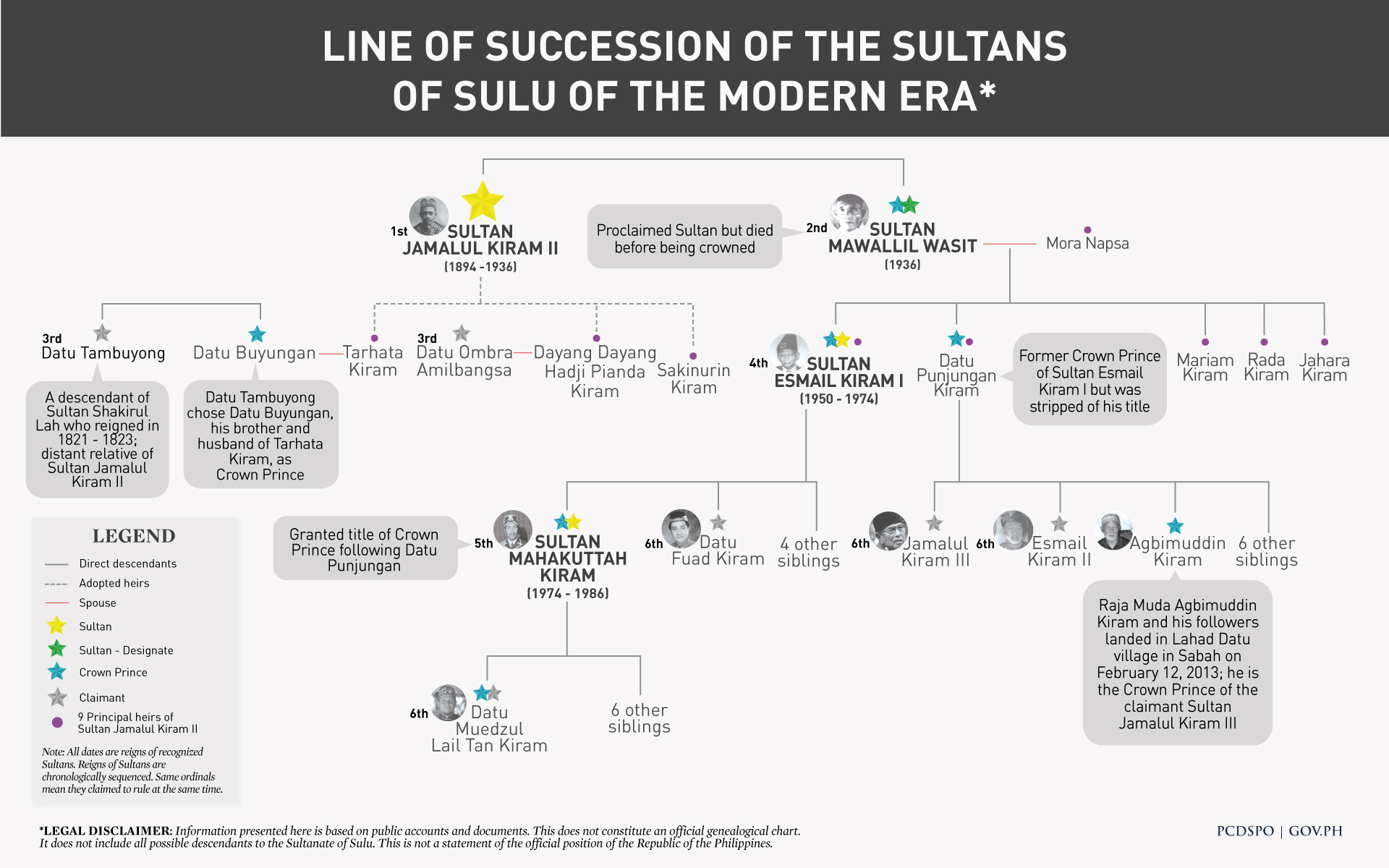
A family tree released by the Official Gazette of the Republic of the Philippines at the height of the 2013 Lahad Datu standoff.

Any claimed political sovereignty of the sultanate was formally abolished in 1915, when Sultan Jamalul Kiram II renounced his remaining territories to the Insular Government. Its successor state, the Philippines, became a republic which repeatedly attested in its constitutions that no titles of royalty or nobility are recognized. Any payments and recognition of the Sultanate of Sulu from the Philippine government ceased in 1936, after the death of the last sultan. (Note: After the death of Sultan Jamalul Kiram II in 1936, L. H. Foulds, British Consul-General in Manila, inquired the government of the Philippines, successor in sovereignty to the United States of America, regarding the successor to the late sultan. The Philippines replied that they were no longer recognised the existence of the Sultanate of Sulu nor any person that might be appointed as a successor to the late sultan, as Foulds later reported in a letter to the governor of North Borneo dated 28 July 1936. Any Philippine government payments to the royal family were also terminated. Foulds's claim was rebutted by heirs to the late sultan, although the government later restated this position in a memorandum by President Manuel L. Quezon.)

Despite this, some administrations of the Philippines have held dealings with the House of Kiram. This has been inherently linked to the interests of the Philippines in the North Borneo dispute: in return for some forms of recognition desired by the royal family (described as a "symbolic reenactment of the sultanate"), the Philippines emboldened their claim to the territory of what is now Sabah, which would form Malaysia in 1963.

In 1962, during the negotiations for Sabah's union with Malaysia, the Philippine government under Diosdado Macapagal dealt with the royal family in an official capacity by recognizing their claim to Sabah. The Instrument of Cession of the Territory of North Borneo was signed by Sultan Mohammed Esmail Kiram and Vice-president Emmanuel Pelaez on 12 September. This view was repeated by the administration of Philippine president Ferdinand Marcos on 24 May 1974, who endorsed Mohammed Mahakuttah Abdullah Kiram's coronation as sultan after his father's death under Memo Order 427, stating that "The Government has always recognised the Sultanate of Sulu as the legitimate claimant to the historical territories of the Republic of Philippines". Marcos' act also acted as an attempt to reduce the Moro National Liberation Front's growing influence in the region.

The descendants of the royal family have also laid their own claim to Sabah, as seen most dramatically in the 2013 Lahad Datu standoff and later in the Malaysia Sulu case. They are still recognised and honoured as de facto royalty by the people in Sulu. In some cases, the claimants established religious courts to arbitrate local disputes according to traditional Muslim customs; three of these existed in Sulu in 1963. (Note: They were headed by Mohammed Esmail Kiram (judged cases from southeastern Jolo), Datu Hadji Amilbangsa (father of Ombra Amilbangsa; judged cases from the southern islands), and Jamalul Abirin (son of Jainal Abirin II; judged cases from northeastern Jolo).)

Name	Reign	Life details
Muwallil Wasit II	17 July 1936 – 21 November 1936 (4 months)	Younger brother of Jamalul Kiram II and his Raja Muda (heir apparent).; Acclaimed as sultan by the Ruma Bechara after Jamalul Kiram II's death.; Contested by Dayang Dayang Piandao, Jamalul Kiram II's niece and adopted daughter.; Died under suspicious circumstances before his coronation ceremony.; His death created a succession crisis, as no new Raja Muda had been chosen.
Jainal Abirin II (Tambuyong)	20 January 1937 – 14 October 1950 (13 years, 8 months)	A datu who was a descendant of Shakirullah.; Acclaimed as sultan in Patikul, from where he ruled.; Contested by Ombra Amilbangsa and Esmail Kiram.; Supported by the American forces in the Pacific War.; Reigned until his death.
Amirul Umara II (Ombra Amilbangsa)	29 January 1937 – 20 November 1950 (13 years, 9 months)	Son-in-law of Jamalul Kiram II through Dayang Dayang Piandao.; Acclaimed as sultan in Maimbung, from where he ruled.; Contested by Jainal Abirin II and Esmail Kiram. The latter was persuaded to become his heir rather than another rival to the throne.; Entered politics, often supporting independence for the Province of Sulu.; Collaborated with the Japanese government in the Pacific War.
Mohammed Esmail Kiram	20 November 1950 – December 1973 (23 years)	Son of Muwallil Wasit II.; Acclaimed as sultan following Jainal Abirin II's death.; Issued a decree canceling the "lease" of northeastern Borneo in 1957.; Signed the transfer of Sabah to the Philippines in 1962, a key event in the North Borneo dispute.; Reigned until his death.
Mohammed Mahakuttah Abdullah Kiram	24 May 1974 – 16 February 1986 (11 years, 8 months)	Son of Mohammed Esmail Kiram.; Crowned in a ceremony sponsored by Ferdinand Marcos, whose administration would continuously support him.; Contested by his brother Punjungan and later his nephew Jamalul.; Reigned until his death.; Last sultan to be awarded titular recognition by the Philippine government.

=== Unrecognized sultans (1986–present) ===
After Mahakuttah Kiram's death and the People Power Revolution, claimants from rival branches of the royal family appeared. Corazon Aquino was reluctant to renew the Sabah dispute, a position maintained by the succeeding Philippine governments. The administration of Benigno Aquino III studied the succession dispute in 2013, making no declarations of support to any of the contenders. By 2016, there were at least five main pretenders to the title of sultan of Sulu.

Name	Reign	Life details
Jamalul Kiram III	15 June 1986 – 20 October 2013 (27 years, 4 months)	Son of Punjungan Kiram, younger son of Muwallil Wasit II and pretender from 1980.; Crowned as self-proclaimed sultan after Mahakuttah Kiram's death.; Named sultan together with his brother Esmail after an agreement in 2012.; His brother Agbimuddin invaded Sabah, resulting in the 2013 Lahad Datu standoff, after which both were classified as terrorists by the Malaysian government.; Contested by his cousin Muedzul and numerous other pretenders.; Maintained his claim until his death.
Ismael Kiram II (Note: Due to different regional spellings, his name appears as Esmail, Esmael, Ismail, or Ismael.)	12 March 2001 – 19 September 2015 (14 years, 6 months)	Younger brother of Jamalul Kiram III and his Raja Muda (chosen heir apparent).; Self-proclaimed as "reigning sultan" when Jamalul Kiram III left for Manila in 2001.; Named sultan together with his brother Jamalul after an agreement in 2012.; Contested by his cousin Muedzul and numerous other pretenders.; Maintained his claim until his death.
Muedzul Lail Tan Kiram	16 September 2012 – present (14 years, 2 months)	Sultan Fuad Kiram Proclaiming Sultan Muedzul-Lail Tan Kiram the Legitimate Sultan of Sulu.; Regent Sultan Fuad Abdulla Kiram Royal Testament Proclaiming Sultan Muedzul-Lail Tan Kiram as the Legitimate Sultan of Sulu: Eldest son of Mahakuttah Kiram and his Raja Muda (chosen heir apparent).; Last recognized Raja Muda.; Established the Royal and Hashemite Order of the Pearl in 2011.; Crowned on Maimbung's historic coronation site in 2012.; Contested by his cousin Jamalul, his later successors, and numerous other pretenders.; One of the current claimants to the throne.
Phugdalun Kiram II	6 February 2016 – present (10 years, 9 months)	Younger brother of Esmail Kiram II and his Raja Muda (chosen heir apparent).; Installed as self-proclaimed sultan in Patikul.; One of the litigants in the Malaysia Sulu case, which sought billions of US dollars from Malaysia through forum shopping.; Contested by his cousin Muedzul and numerous other pretenders.; One of the current claimants to the throne.

Pretenders from other houses

- House of Abirin
  - Mohammad Venizar Julkarnain Jainal Abirin
- House of Bahjin
  - Ibrahim Q. Bahjin-Shakirullah II (2004–present)
  - Muizuddin Jainal Abirin Bahjin

== Genealogical chart ==
Genealogical chart of the sultans of Sulu

Ba 'Alawi sada
Ali Zayn al-Abidin	Raja; Baguinda
SULTANATE; OF SULU
1 Sharif ul-Hāshim r. 1450–1480	Paramisuli
Sultanate of Brunei
2 Kamal ud-Din r. 1480–1505	3 Alauddin	Sharif Ali r. 1425–1432
4 Amirul Umara I r. 1505–1527	Sulaiman r. 1432–1485
5 Muizzul; Mutawadi'in r. 1527–1548	Bolkiah r. 1485–1524
Sultanate of Maguindanao
6 Nasir ud-Din I r. 1548–1568	Abdul Kahar r. 1524–1530	Sharif; Muhammad; Kabungsuwan r. 1520–1543
7 Muhammad ul-Halim r. 1568–1596	Saiful Rijal r. 1533–1581	Sharif; Maka-alang r. 1543–1574
8 Batara; Shah Tengah r. 1596–1608	Putri Sulu	Muhammad; Hasan r. 1582–1598	Sharif; Bangkaya r. 1574–1578
9 Muwallil; Wasit I r. 1610–1650	Kapitan; Laut Buisan r. 1597–1619	Gugu; Sarikula r. 1585–1597	Raja Putri
11; Salah ud-Din; Bakhtiar r. 1650–1680	12; Ali Shah	10; Nasir ud-Din II r. 1645–1648	Daughter	14; Al Haqunu ibn Wali ul-Ahad
15; Shahab ud-Din r. 1685–1710	16; Mustafa; Shafi ud-Din r. 1710–1718	17; Badar ud-Din I r. 1718–1732	13; Nur ul-Azam
18; Nasar ud-Din r. 1732–1735	19; Azim ud-Din I r. 1735–1748, 1764–1774	20; Bantilan; Muizzud-Din r. 1748–1763
21; Muhammad; Israil I r. 1774–1778	23; Sharaf ud-Din r. 1791–1808	Datu Putong	22; Azim ud-Din II r. 1763–1764, 1778–1791
24; Azim ud-Din III r. 1808–1808	25; Aliyud-Din I r. 1808–1821	Fatima; Paramisuli	26; Shakirullah r. 1821–1823	Datu Dadung	Datu Bantilan
House of Kiram
27; Jamalul; Kiram I r. 1823–1844	Aliyud-Din II r. 1823–1823	Israil II r. 1823–1862	Datu Buyok	Datu Ja'afar	Datu Aranan
28; Mohammad; Pulalun Kiram r. 1844–1862	Aliyud-Din III r. 1862–1896	Datu Jamalul	Datu Zulkifli
29; Jamal ul-Azam r. 1862–1881	House of Shakirullah	Datu Uyong	31; Harun; Ar-Rashid r. 1886–1894
30; Badarud-Din II r. 1881–1884	32; Jamalul; Kiram II r. 1894–1936	Muwallil; Wasit II r. 1936–1936	Jainal Abirin II r. 1937–1950
House of Abirin
Amirul; Umara II r. 1937–1950	Dayang; Dayang; Piandao	Esmail; Kiram I r. 1950–1973	Punjungan; Kiram
Mahakuttah; Kiram r. 1974–1986	Fuad; Abdullah; Kiram r. 2004–present	Jamalul; Kiram III r. 1986–2013	Esmail; Kiram II r. 2001–2015	Phugdalun; Kiram II r. 2016–present
Muedzul Lail; Tan Kiram r. 2012–present

Sultans of Sulu (who effectively reigned; recognized titular rulers after 1936)
Contending sultan who was Raja Muda (designated heir) at previous sultan's death
Other contenders to the sultanate

== See also ==
- List of Sunni dynasties
- Non-sovereign monarchy
