= Jamalul Kiram =

Jamalul Kiram may refer to:

- Jamalul Kiram I or Muwalil Wasit, Sultan of Sulu 1823—1844
- Jamalul Kiram II, Sultan of Sulu and North Borneo 1894—1936
- Jamalul Kiram III (1938—2013), self-proclaimed Sultan of Sulu
