= CA Paris =

CA Paris may refer to:

- CA Paris-Charenton
- Court of Appeal of Paris
