= Dingle Church =

Roman Catholic church in Iloilo, Philippines

- Saint John the Baptist Parish Church
- Simbahang Parokyal ni San Juan Bautista (Filipino)
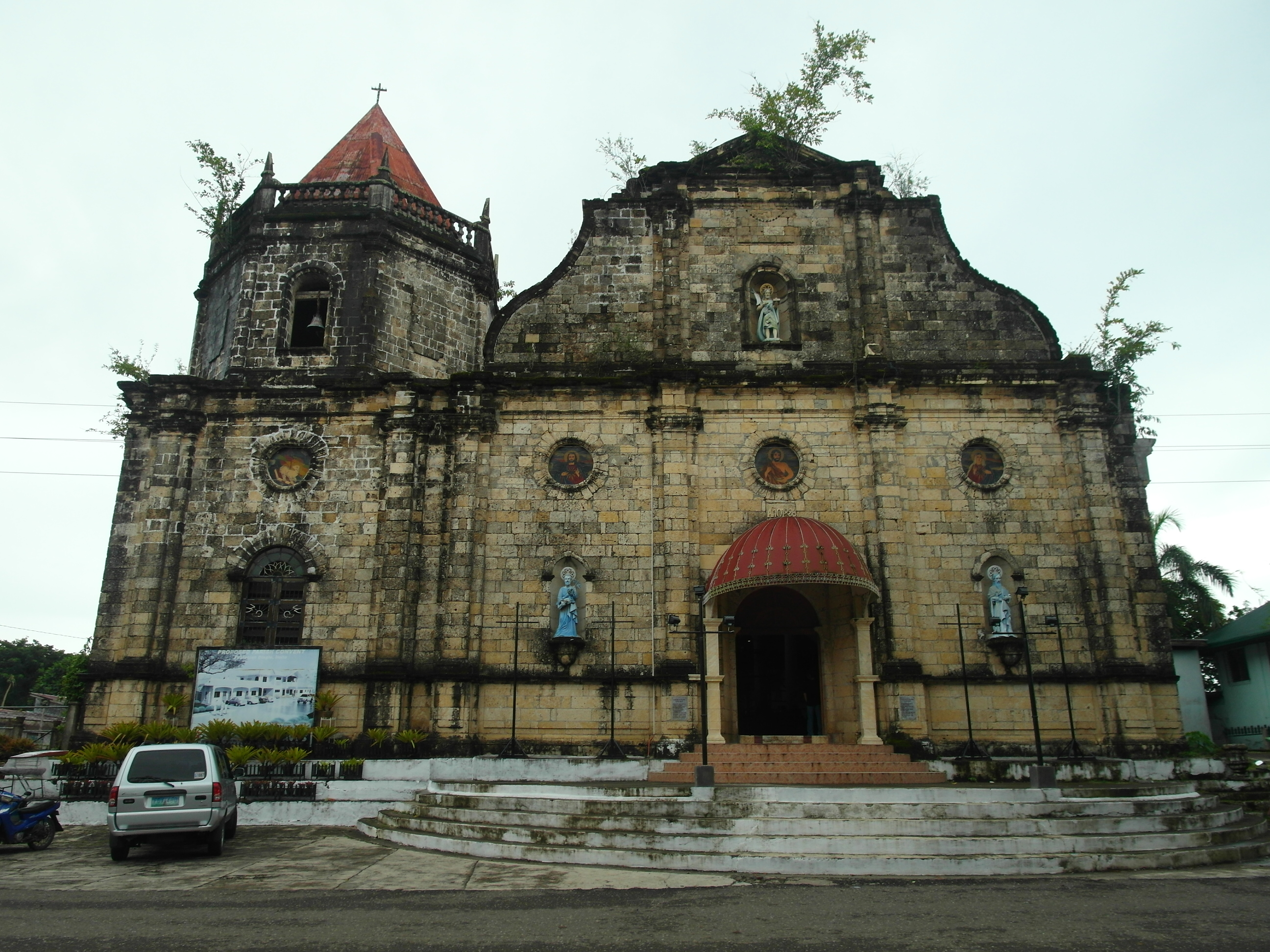
- Church façade in 2011

- Location in the Visayas Location in the Philippines
- 11°00′02″N 122°40′16″E
- Location: Dingle, Iloilo
- Country: Philippines
- Denomination: Roman Catholic

Architecture
- Architectural type: Church building

Administration
- Archdiocese: Jaro

Saint John the Baptist Parish Church, commonly known as Dingle Church, is a Roman Catholic parish church located at the municipality of Dingle, Iloilo in the Philippines. It is under the jurisdiction of the Archdiocese of Jaro. Finished in 1886, save for the still uncompleted bell tower, the church stands as a fine example of Baroque architecture exuding the style of Neoclassical extravagance.

== History ==
Fray Diego Álvarez of the Augustinians founded Dingle, then known as Baong, as a visita of Pototan in 1593. Pototan, a village then ruined, was briefly annexed to Baong after the former's population significantly decreased. Accordingly, a church was built in Baong. Around this time, Baong had a population of more than 1,000 and was a well-known place for recreation. Baong became a pueblo on its own right on April 23, 1611 before being annexed as a visita to Dumangas and Laglag respectively in 1629 and 1641.

On April 28, 1823, Dingle was re-elevated into a pueblo after five years under Dumangas and 182 years under Laglag through the petition of a Dingleño teniente mayor (deputy gobernadorcillo) of Laglag, Don Juan Marcelino Dayot.

In 1829, during the tenure of Dayot as gobernadorcillo of Dingle and Fray Juan Frayle as parish priest of Laglag, under which parish Dingle still belonged to, construction of the current church made of granite stone quarried from nearby Bulabog Putian mountains commenced. On August 16, 1850, by order of governor-general Urbiztondo, Dingle became a parish independent from that of Laglag. Its first patron was St. Monica. It was later changed to the Assumption of Our Lady, and finally, to St. John the Baptist.

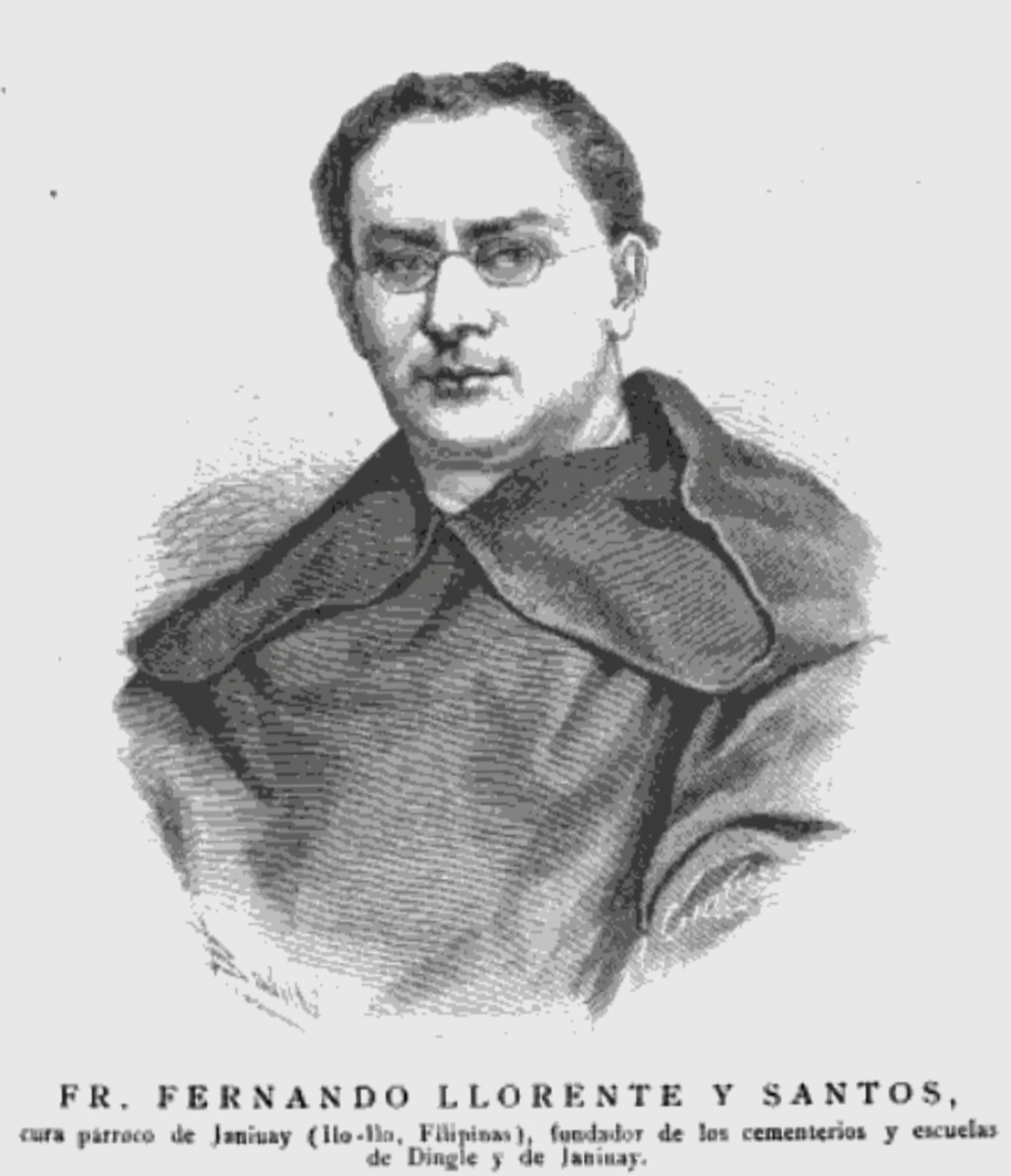
Fr. Fernando Llorente y Santos, OSA, cura párroco of the Parish of St. John the Baptist of Dingle, Iloilo (1865–1874), and builder of the current structure of Dingle Church

To solidify Dingle's ecclesiastical prominence, Fray Fernando Llorente y Santos ordered the continuation of the construction of the current structure of the Parish Church of St. John the Baptist in 1865 from the work started by Fray Juan Frayle and Dingle gobernadorcillo Don Juan Marcelino Dayot in 1829. Fray Melquiades Arizmendi did the same from 1876 to 1887. Fray Rafael Murillo completed the construction from 1887 to 1893. The bell tower, however, remains unfinished to this day. The construction of the church from Fray Llorente covered the terms of Dingle gobernadorcillos Domingo Osano, Luís Cantalicio Dayot, and Santiago and Tomás Sanico.

In December 1900, a fire destroyed all of the edifice in town save for the stone church.

== Architecture ==
Dingle Church is a classic example of Baroque architecture, characterized by its broad facade, simplistic niche and its sturdy, triangular-shaped pediment. Though it lacks the opulent lavishness of most churches, it is infused with the Neoclassical elaborate style of volute shaping the upper facade. Unlike the baroque churches of Ilocos, the pediment of Dingle Church is attached to the church itself but is heavily fortified by pilasters and multi-faceted columns.

Baked bricks in the color of cream lined up its interiors. Supporting the ornately carved ceiling is a line of slender Corinthian columns standing across the room. The altar where the statue of St. John the Baptist stands is supported by a stonework of columns raised in a marble dais.

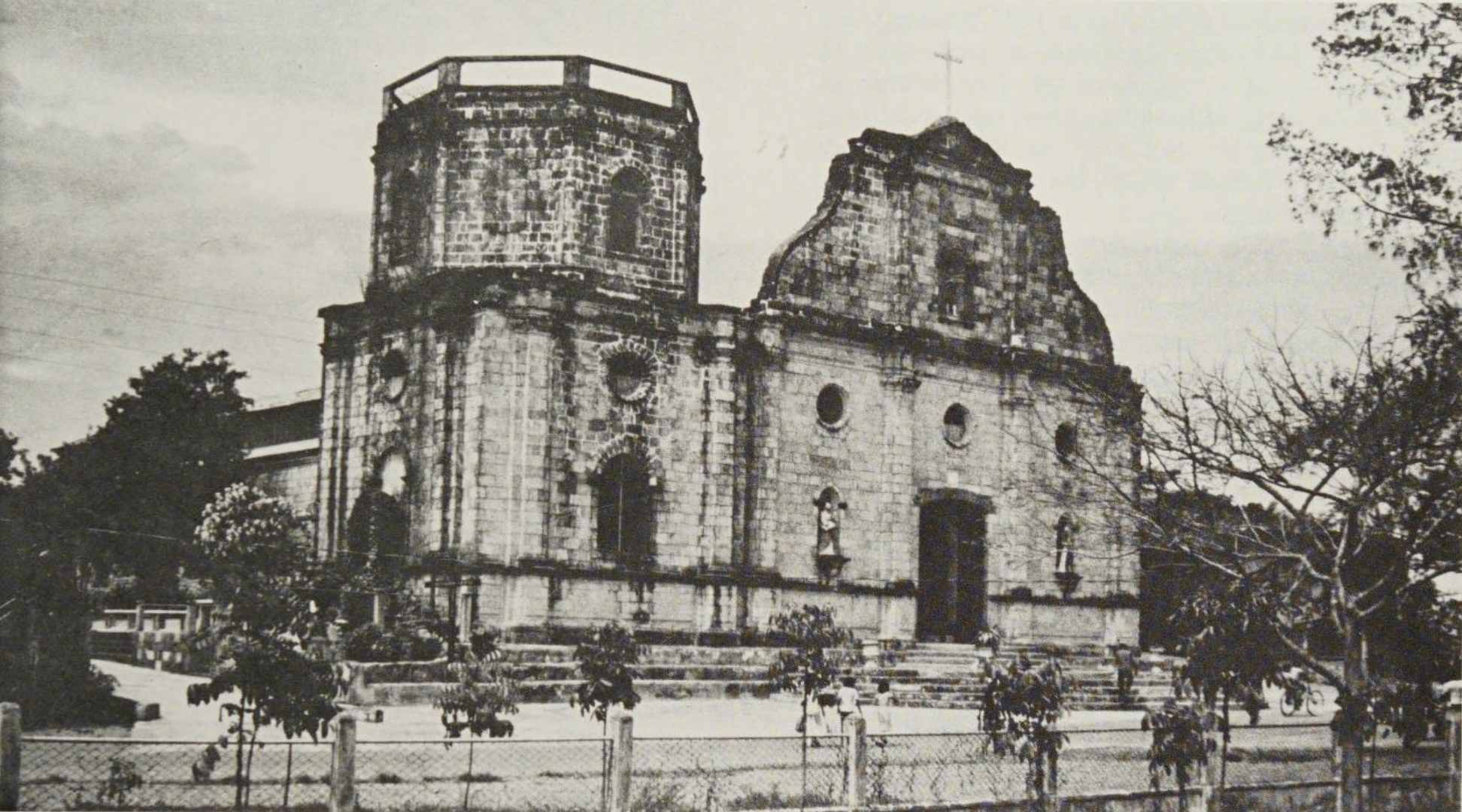
Dingle Church with its unfinished bell tower in 1987

A short flight of stairs lead the laity to the entrance of the church. Its facade is rendered asymmetrical with a bell tower that stands in its gospel side. Its facade and bell tower feature arches, round apertures, and pilasters.

There is a small red half-dome over the entryway that serves as a portico, its roof decorated with volutes, lines, and scroll-work. Above the entryway are the words: “Año 1886” which translates to “Year 1886”, indicating the year that the church was completed. On either sides are niches of holy figures. In the upper story, the middle panel bears the niche of the patron. Its sidewalls terminate in curvilinear lines. On the other hand, the bell tower has an arch window with tracery in its base. Its second level is hexagonal with open and blind alternating on each side. It is capped with a balustrade and red pyramidal roof.

The interiors feature Corinthian columns along the length of the nave, and ornamental half-quatrefoil arches are found in between each pair of columns. The ceiling on the side aisles are lower than the one above the nave, and it is decorated by rosettes and moldings that divide its face into different panels. There is no choir loft, the space immediately by the entrance is a narthex that is separated by a stone arcade. The church walls are pierced by arch windows (with stained glass) and portals. Meanwhile, a spiral staircase leads to the belfry.

== Gallery ==
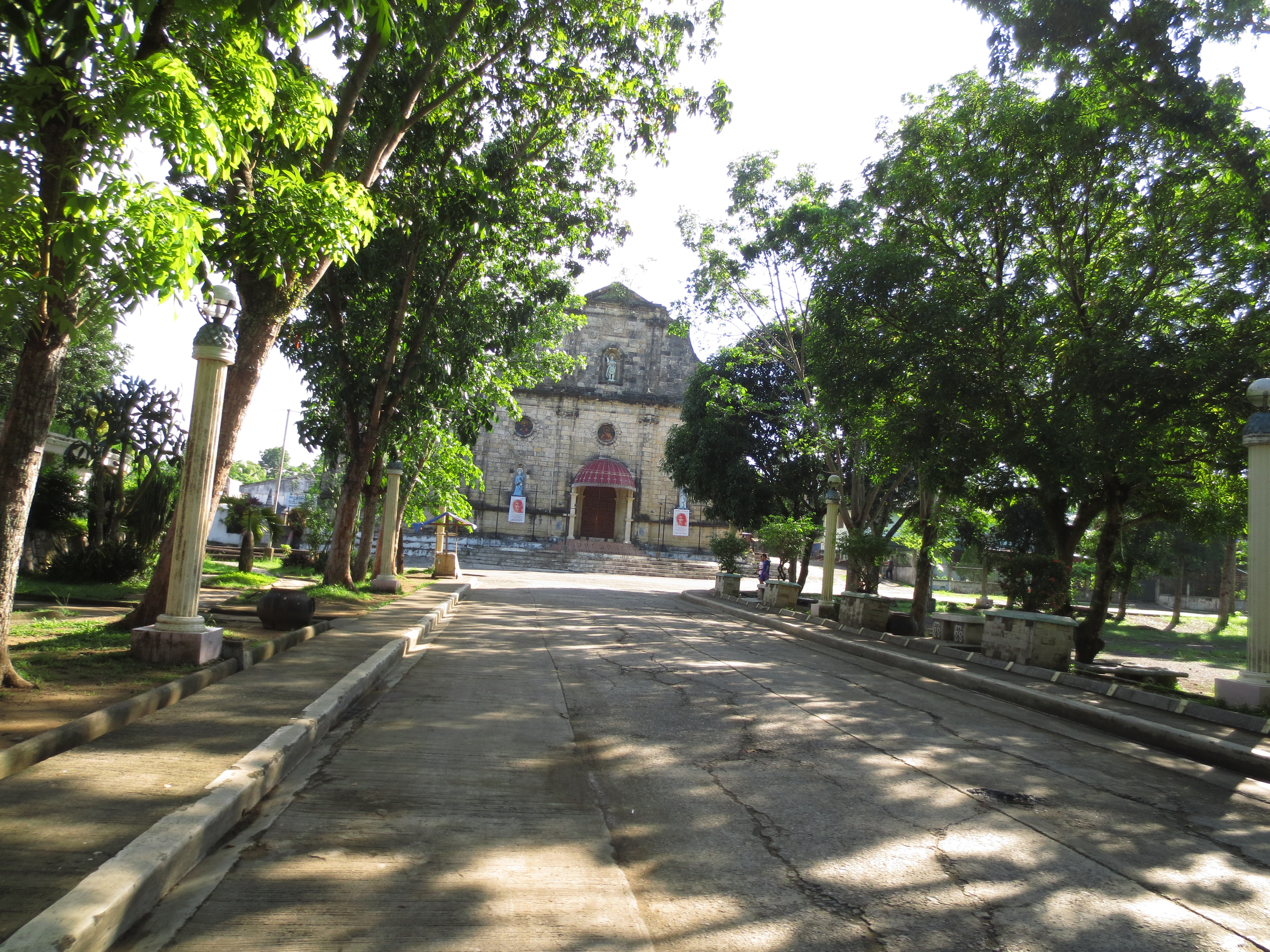
The church from the Dingle plaza

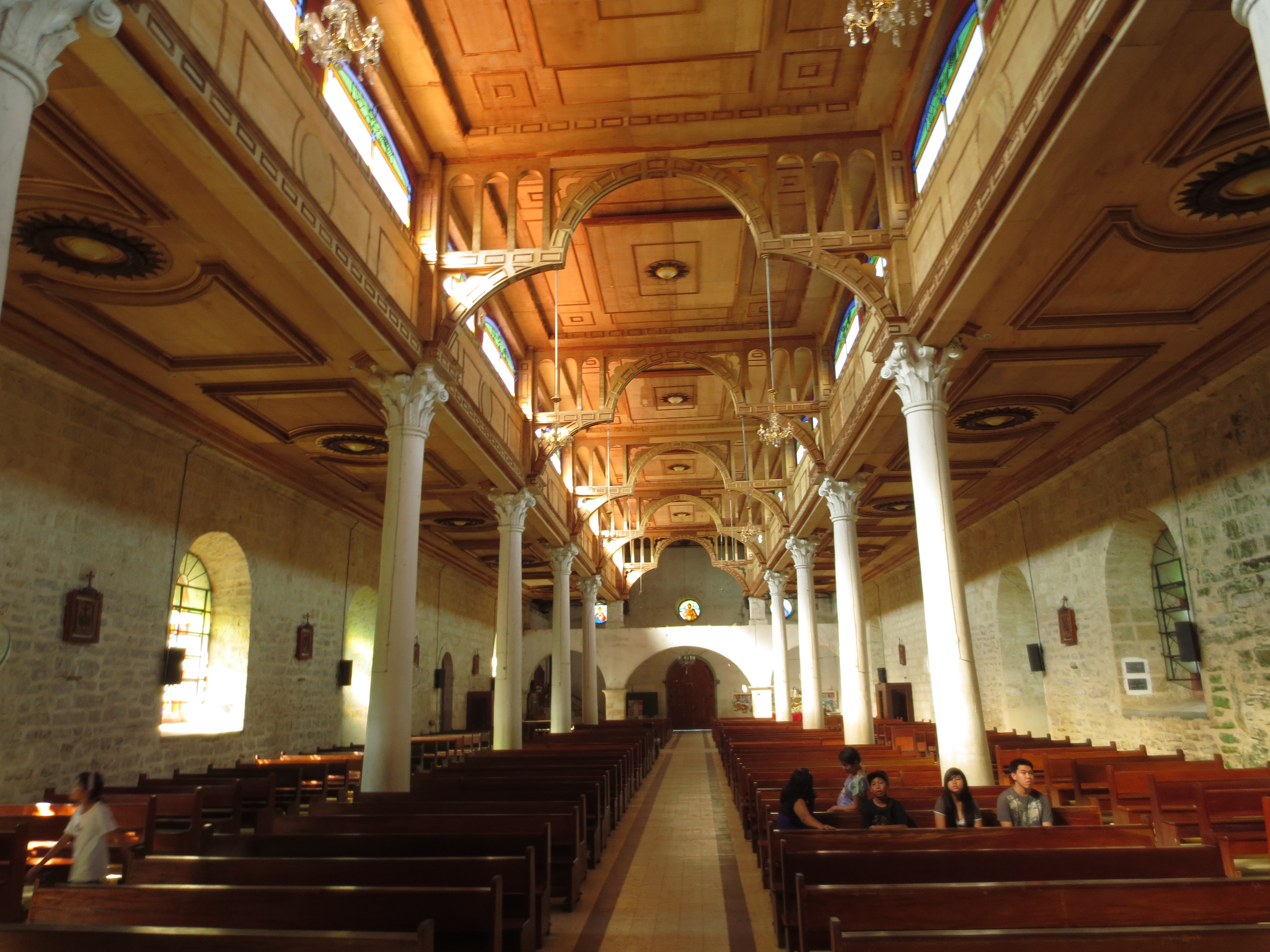
Church interior in 2013

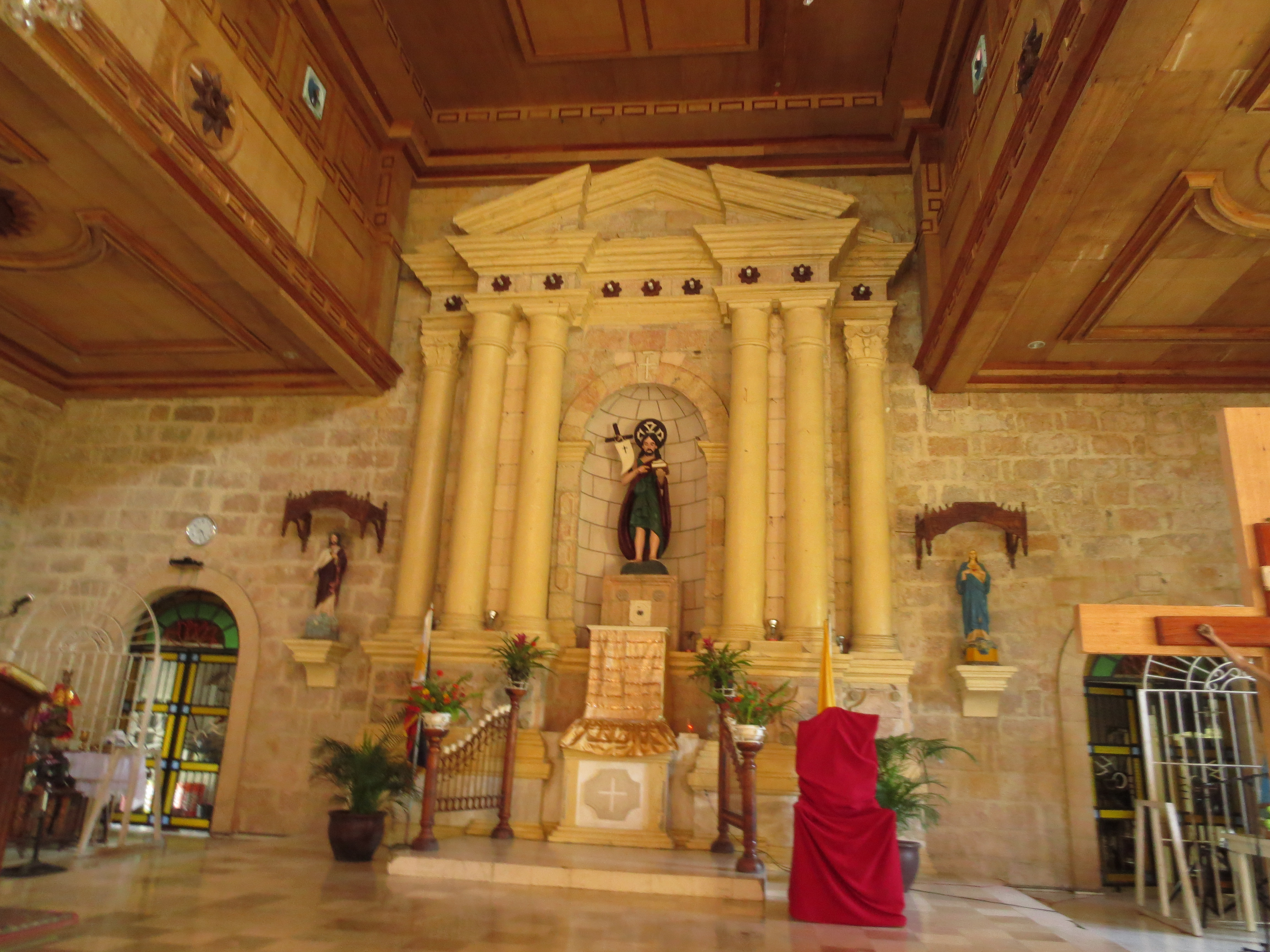
Church altar

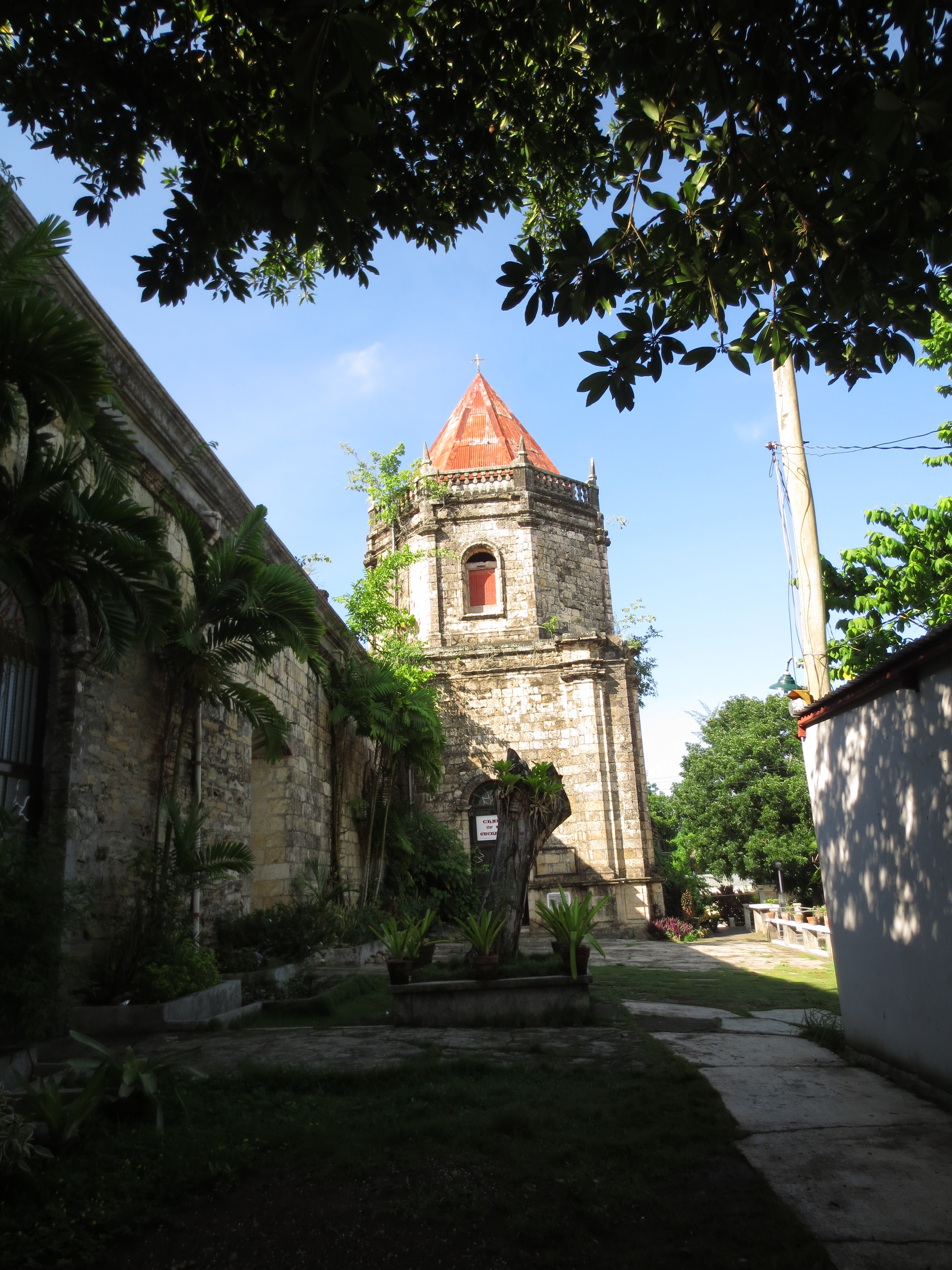
Church bell tower

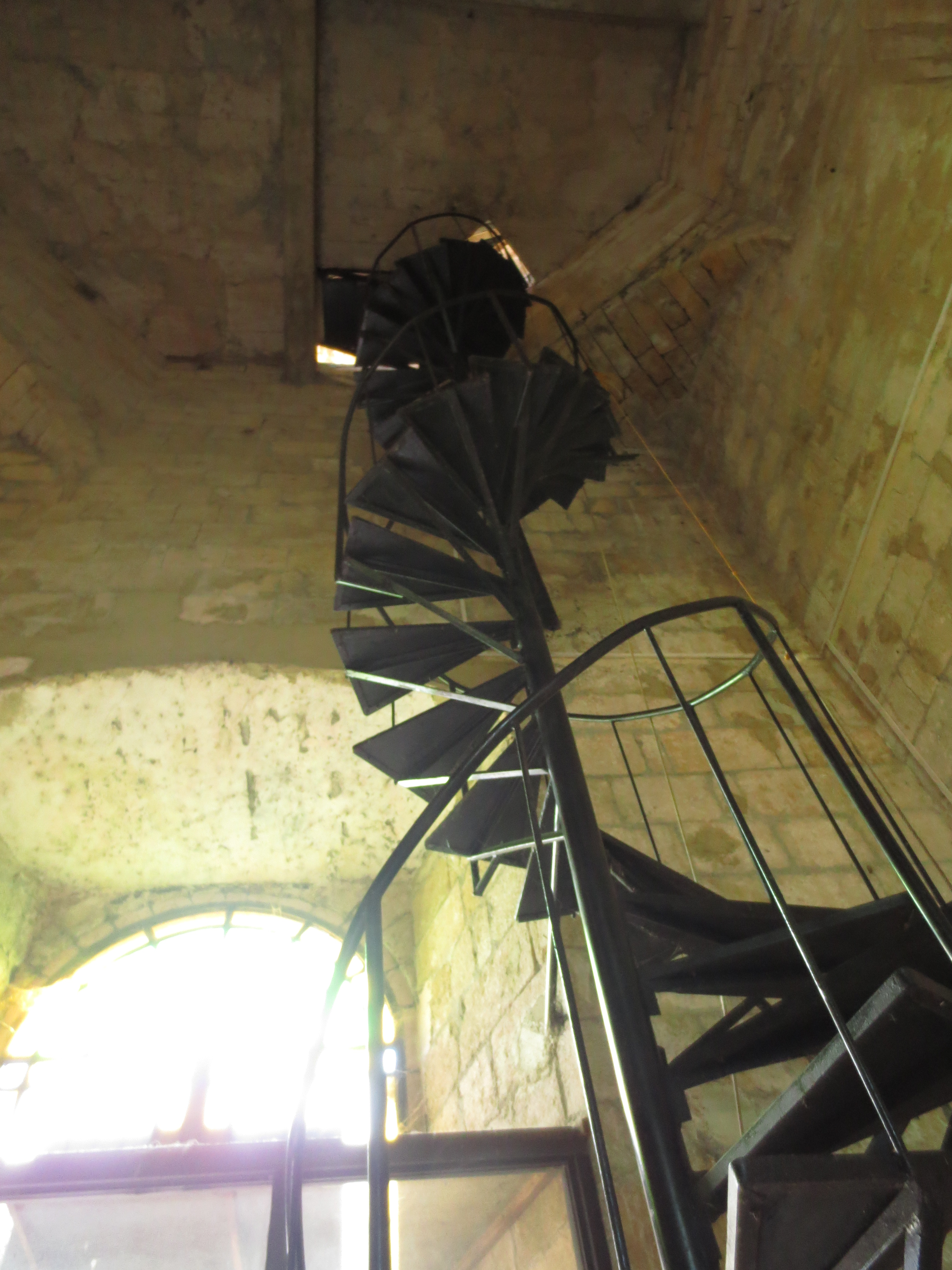
A spiral staircase leading to the top of the bell tower

== See also ==
- Architecture of the Philippines
- Spanish Baroque architecture
