= Jamalul Kiram III =

Pretender to the Sulu Sultanate (1938–2013)

Jamalul Kiram III جَمَلُلْ كِرَمْ ٣

Pretender to the Sultanate of Sulu
- Pretence: June 15, 1986 – October 20, 2013
- Predecessor: Aguimuddin Abirin and Mohammad Akijal Atti
- Successor: Ismael Kiram II
- Born: July 16, 1938; Maimbung, Sulu, Commonwealth of the Philippines
- Died: October 20, 2013 (aged 75); Quezon City, Philippines
- Issue: Jacel Kiram
- House: Royal House of Kiram
- Father: Datu Punjungan Kiram
- Mother: Sharifa Usna Dalus Strattan
- Religion: Sunni Islam

Jamalul ibni Punjungan Kiram III (July 16, 1938 – October 20, 2013) was a former self-proclaimed Sultan of the Sulu Sultanate who claimed to be "the poorest sultan in the world". He was known as an unsuccessful candidate for senator in the Philippine general elections in 2007. In 2013, Kiram III sparked a controversy when he revived a dispute between the Philippines and Malaysia by leading an intrusion into the eastern part of Sabah. His daughter is Princess Jacel Kiram, a proponent of the Sabah claim of the Philippines in 2016.

== Early life ==
Jamalul was born in Mainbung, Sulu. He was the eldest son of Datu Punjungan Kiram and Sharifa Usna Dalus Strattan. He is descended from the first Sultan of Sulu, Sharif ul-Hāshim of Sulu from the Banu Hashem tribe, the direct descendants of Muhammad. Kiram III also claimed to have a common ancestor with Brunei's current sultan Hassanal Bolkiah, although this was denied by Brunei.

Jamalul Kiram III

Personal details
- Party: Partido Demokratiko Sosyalista ng Pilipinas
- Education: Notre Dame of Jolo College; Manuel L. Quezon University

Kiram III studied in Jolo Central Elementary School from 1946 to 1951. He finished high school at the Sulu High School in 1955 and took up pre-law from 1956 to 1958 at Notre Dame of Jolo. He studied for a Bachelor of Law degree from Manuel L. Quezon University (MLQU) in 1964 but was unable to finish it and pursued a career in dance instead. He was married to Dayang Hadja Fatima Celia H. Kiram, and resided in Taguig, Metro Manila.

== As pretender ==
In the 2007 elections, Jamalul Kiram III unsuccessfully ran as Senator under the banner of TEAM Unity. After the family meeting, Kiram III once again became the self-proclaimed Sultan alongside Ismael Kiram II. He also declared Rajah Mudah Agbimuddin Kiram as "crown prince".

Beginning on February 9, 2013, approximately 200 men led by his brother, Agbimuddin Kiram, intruded into neighbouring Sabah in Malaysia by entering illegally into Lahad Datu, in an effort to assert the former Sulu Sultanate's claim to the state. Kiram was reported to have directed them to intrude and not leave, claiming that "Malaysia is only renting Sabah" from the heirs of the Sultanate. The men, many of whom were heavily armed, engaged in a standoff with Malaysian police and armed forces which saw the death of 56 of his followers while the rest were either captured or escaped. The intrusion was believed to have been caused when the Philippine government treated him and his wife only as "decorations" during the signing of a framework agreement with the Moro Islamic Liberation Front (MILF). President Benigno Aquino III blamed Kiram and his followers for dragging the Philippines into the dispute, damaging relations between Malaysia and the Philippines, with a bad impact on overseas Filipinos in Malaysia. His actions drew criticism from many Filipinos in Sabah, who feared retaliation and discrimination from the local Borneo tribes, especially after the killing of Malaysian police officers from the indigenous Borneo races. Furthermore, other claimants to the Sultanate's authority decried his approach, preferring to pursue peaceful means to resolve the Sabah dispute without resorting to violence.

On October 3, 2024, Malaysia's Federal Court upheld the death sentences of seven Filipino men involved in the 2013 Lahad Datu invasion, which had resulted in the deaths of nine Malaysian security personnel. The ruling was seen as a step toward ensuring justice and strengthening national security in Malaysia.

== Death ==
On October 20, 2013, Kiram III died at the age of 75 due to multiple organ failure. He made a dying request to be buried at the capital of the Sultanate in Maimbung, Sulu. He left eight children by two wives. Numerous political personalities paid their respects to the late Sultan including Autonomous Region in Muslim Mindanao Governor Mujiv Hataman and Sulu Vice-governor Abdusakur Mahail Tan, and former First Lady of the Philippines Imelda Marcos.

His spokesman said that their "royal family" would continue to pursue their main intention over the former dispute between Philippines and Malaysia. The Malaysian branch of police in Sabah has stated that they "would continue to be alert for any intrusion".

== Family ==
Kiram III's daughter, Princess Jacel Kiram, is the designated spokeswoman of the late sultan and the most known of all the members of the Sulu royal family. The princess is currently living in a subdivision established by the Philippine government in Taguig in 1974, along with other members of Kiram III's family. Her father's royal bloodline established her royal ties with the Muslim royals of Sulu, Basilan, Tawi-tawi, Maguindanao, and Lanao del Sur. Her grandmother from the maternal side came from Pangasinan in the Ilocos Region, while her grandfather came from Sorsogon in the Bicol Region. Her name is literally an amalgamation of the Muslim name, Jamulul (from her father), and the Christian name, Celia (from her mother). In 2002, she finished her bachelor of arts with a degree in Inter-Disciplinary Studies at De La Salle–College of Saint Benilde. During that time, her thesis, “The Sulu Sultanate’s Genealogy and its Relation to the Philippines’ Claim to Sabah” was declared as Best Thesis. In 2013, she married Moh Yusop Hasan, a Filipino army major. In 2017, she headed the Philippine delegation on the 19th World Festival of Youth and Students in the World Federation of Democratic Youth held in Sochi, Russia. She was also a delegate of the Philippines to China in celebration of the 600th Year of Sulu-China Friendship, coinciding with the book launching of Friendship Without Borders, in Guangxi. Jacel also participated in a United Nations-sponsored conference on Drug Control Program held at the United Nations Office in Vienna, Austria. She was also the chairman of People's Coalition for Peace.

Regnal titles
Titles in pretence
Preceded by Aguimuddin Abirin	— TITULAR — Sultan of Sulu; 1983–1990; Reason for succession failure: Sultanate powers ceded to the Philippines	Succeeded by Mohammad Akijal Atti
Preceded by Mohammad Akijal Atti	— TITULAR — Sultan of Sulu; 2012–2013 with Ismael Kiram II; Reason for succession failure: Sultanate powers ceded to the Philippines	Succeeded by Ismael Kiram II
