= Badarud-Din II =

Badarud-Din II بَدَرُدِّنْ ٢
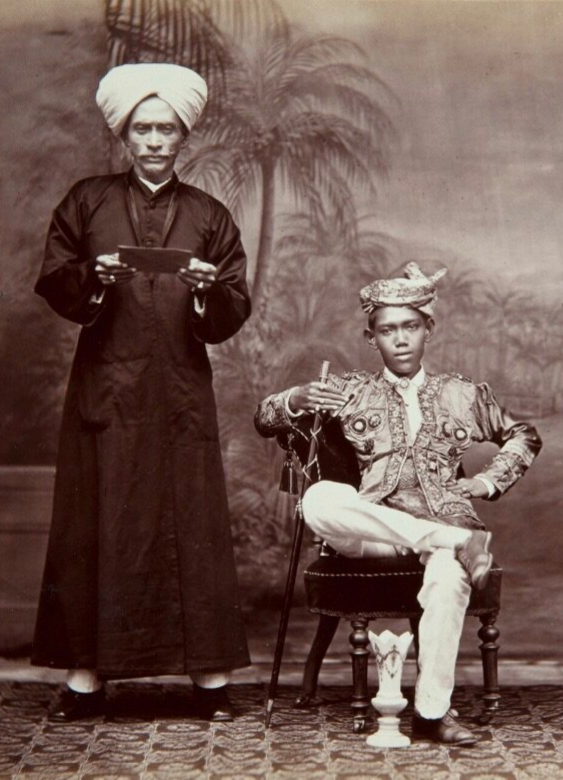
- Sultan Badaruddin II (right) with Hadji Omar (c. 1884) (Note: The photo depicting the "Sultan of Sulu" was widely confused with Jamalul Kiram II.)

Sultan of Sulu
- Reign: 1881–1884
- Predecessor: Jamal ul-Azam
- Successor: Harun Ar-Rashid
- Died: February 22, 1884

Badarud-Din II (d.1884), was sultan of Sulu from 1881 to 1884. He succeeded Jamal ul-Azam shortly after his death. He became sultan at the age of 19 and died in 1884 at the age of 22.

His rule was marked with incompetence due to his lack of education and mismanagement. His death caused a civil war for succession among Maimbung forces and Patikul datus.

== Photograph ==
From a photo in the 1880s, a photo of the "Sultan of Sulu" along with his four servants was widely circulated outside the sultanate. The identification of the four servants were relatively unknown. It was not until January 2022 that a letter by Hadji Butu to Ball Powell was analyzed by Maria Cristina Juan, M.A. from the Museum, Heritage and Material Culture Studies from SOAS, University of London. Powell inquired the names of the people in this particular photo. Butu replied that the photo depicts Sultan Badaruddin II and his four servants: Hadji Bandahali, Hadji Omar, Hadji Samla, and Samania, the son of Hajdi Omar.

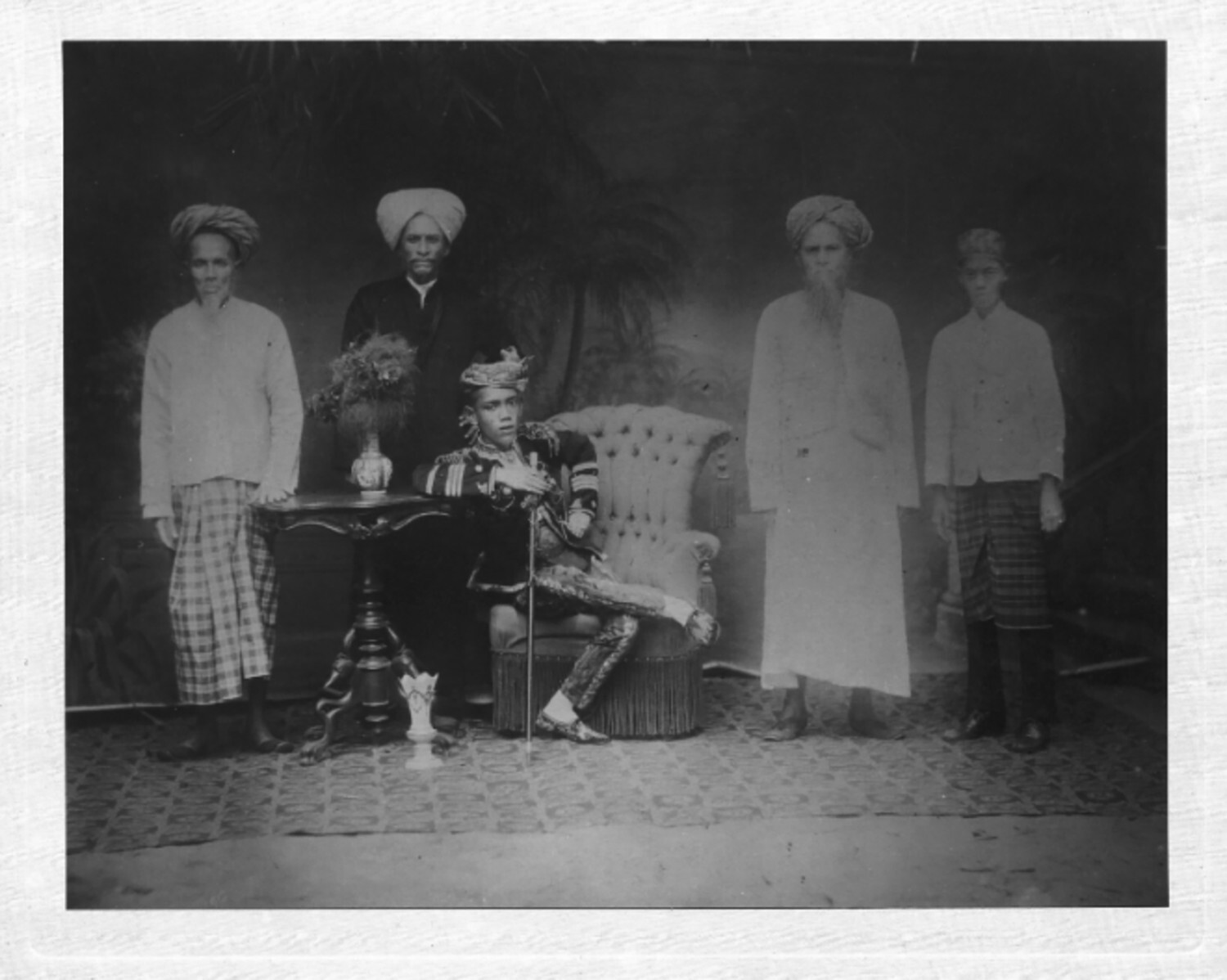
According to Hadji Butu, the photo depicts Sultan Badarud-Din II accompanied by four servants (from left to right): Hadji Bandahali, Hadji Omar, Hadji Samla, and Samania, the son of Hajdi Omar (c. 1884)

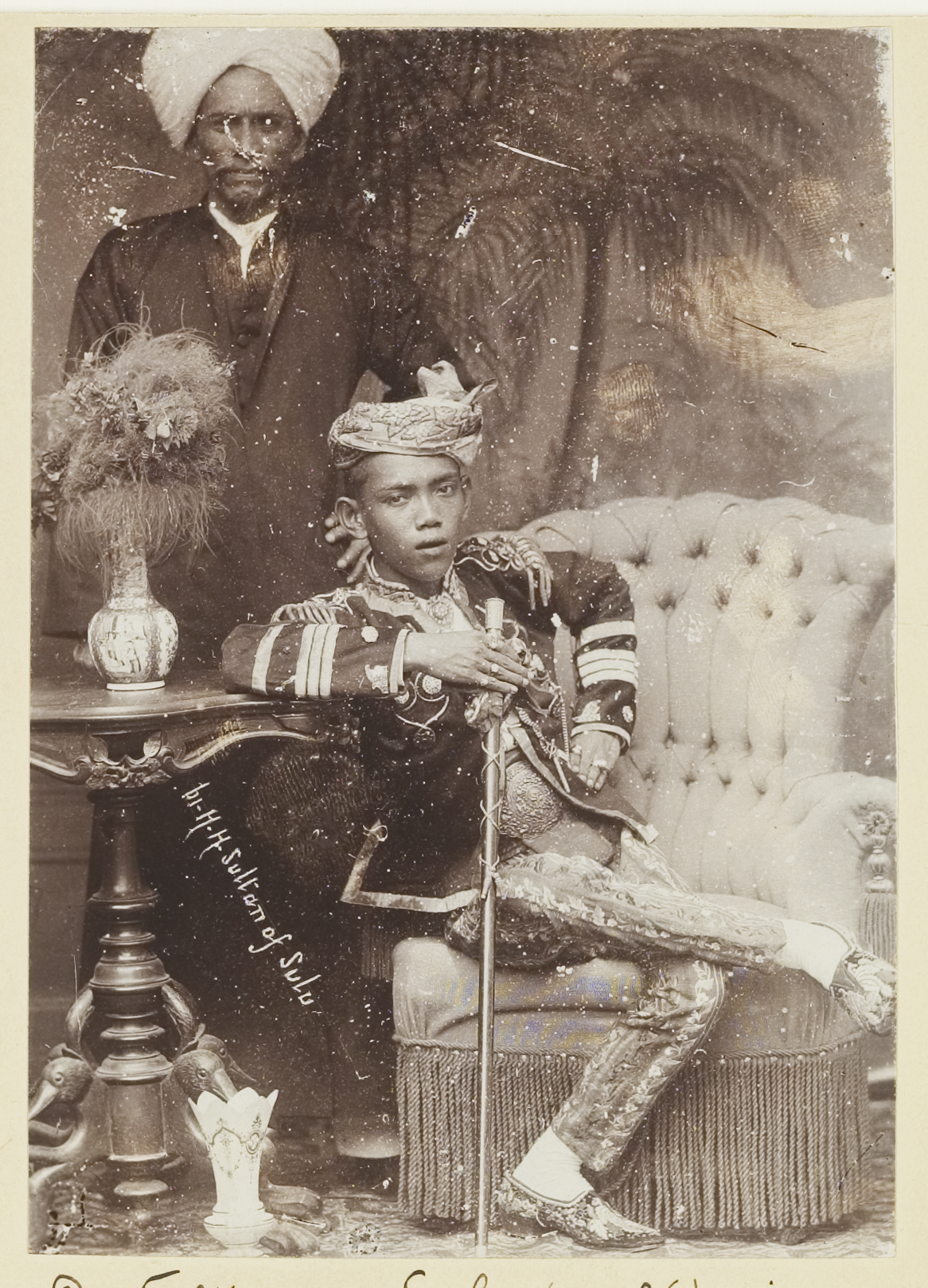
1887 image reproduction of the widely circulated photo of Sultan Badaruddin, suspected to be of Jamalul Kiram II. Released by Leiden University Library

== Rule ==
Sultan Badaruddin II made his pilgrimage to Mecca. On his return, he met a representative from the Spanish colonial government in Singapore to return to the Philippine Islands. The sultan declined. He returned to Sulu in 1883 but came to the conclusion to travel to Manila. This decision was met with uncertainty of disturbance from Lu’uk and Parang.

Desiring to extend his authority in Sulu, he bought two Egyptian officers and 30 Sikhs from Singapore. He also organized a police force for the sultanate. Due to his lack of education and mismanagement, the force weren't paid well and some decided to quit their duties from the sultan.

Badaruddin moved his residence in Matanda where a house was made by the governor of Sulu. In 1883, a juramentado, disregarding his post, killed two officers and wounded some Spanish officers. Alarmed by these events, the governor of Sulu requested the sultan to punish the juramentado. The sultan did not respond. In order to restore peace, the governor of Sulu used his influence to reestablished peace and deescalate tensions. Due to the governor's friendship with the sultan, they complied.

== Death and aftermath ==
In February 22, 1884, Badaruddin died. His death caused dissentions among Sulus and subsequent dissatisfaction. He died without leaving a male heir.

=== Civil War ===
The death of Badaruddin caused a civil war among Patikul datus and Maimbung forces. The Patikul datus were led by Datu Aliyyud while the Maimbung forces were led by Amirul Kiram. Amirul Kiram, also known as Jamalul Kiram II, was a bitter rival of his brother Badaruddin. He gathered and collect his forces to attack the Spanish military and claim the sultanate.

In 1886, Harun Ar-Rashid was recommended by Governor Juan Arolas to be sultan of Sulu.

=== Northern Borneo ===
Sultan Jamal ul-Alam, his father, sign a Grant of 1878 to give North Borneo to a British company. He died in 1881 to be succeeded by his son Badaruddin. Unexpectedly, Badaruddin died at an early age withholding the contract until a new sultan recognized by the Spanish Government was appointed.
