= Harun Ar-Rashid (sultan of Sulu) =

Harun Ar-Rashid هَرُنْ اَرَّسْيِدْ
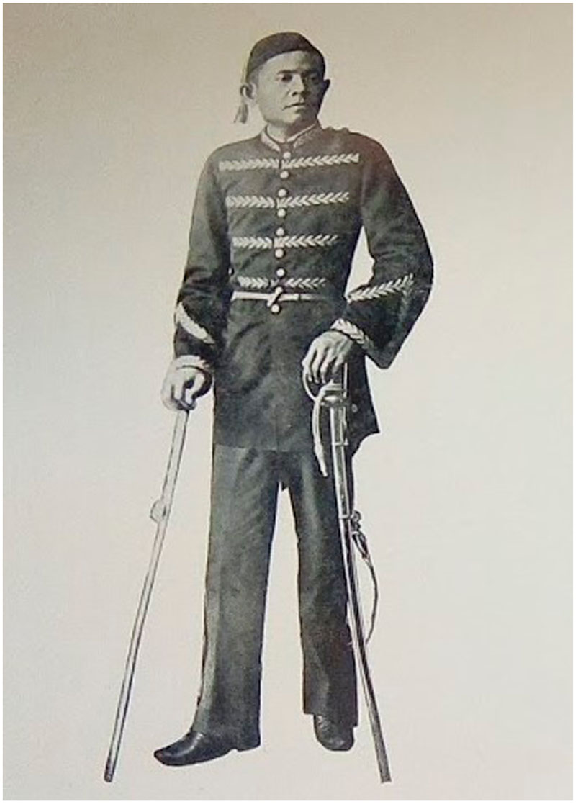
- Sultan Harun Ar-Rashid in 1886

Sultan of Sulu
- Reign: 1886–1894
- Predecessor: Mohammed Badarud-Din II
- Successor: Jamalul Kiram II

Datu of Palawan
- Reign: 1894–1899
- Successor: Bataraza Narrazid
- Born: 1769; Jolo, Sultanate of Sulu
- Died: April 1899; Palawan
- Issue: Datu Bataraza Narrazid; Datu Zulkifli II; Dayang Nurniyam; Datu Imam Puyung; Haji Mahol; Datu Taib S. Harun Ar-Rashid
- Father: Datu Zulkifli I
- Religion: Sunni Islam

Sultan Harun Ar-Rashid was a sultan of Sulu from 1886 to 1894. He was confirmed a sultan by the Spanish colonial government and was appointed on September 24, 1886. His reign ended in 1894 due to the lack of support from fellow Sulus and regional unrest. He was removed from appointment by Spanish authorities.

== Ascension ==
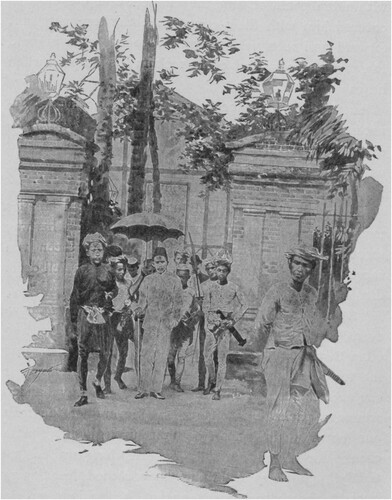
Sultan Harun Ar-Rashid in Sulu, from a book by Dean Conant Worcester in 1899

As a Datu, he went to Manila alone and Governor Juan Arolas recommended him for sultanate. Governor-General Emilio Terrero y Perinat received authority from Madrid to take action for the appointment of Datu Harun. Datu Harun was appointed sultan of Sulu on September 24, 1886.

For the celebration of his appointment, Harun was escorted to Jolo, Sulu by 200 Spanish soldiers for his return from Manila. He made plans to go to Parang in order to make allegiance with his people. Unfortunately, his appointment was met with dissatisfaction. He retired in Jolo for his safety. The Sulu chiefs, with arms, demanded that Amirul Kiram should be the Sultan.

== Rule ==
Amirul Kiram's activities and the Maimbung forces' attacks on Parang caused significant unrest in the region. Harun's sultanate was unpopular with many datus, leading to hostilities and violence in various localities. The kutas of Bwisan and Timahu were attacked, and many people were killed. Hostilities spread to Siasi, and Jolo was attacked by a large Sulu force in February 1887. The garrison repelled the attack, but the town continued to be harassed by juramentados and hostile bands. Small expeditions were sent to Tapul, Lugus, and Siasi, but active measures against Maimbung were delayed until reinforcements arrived.

In July 1887, Inchi Jamila went to Jolo to expressed their surrender on behalf of her husband Raja Muda Amirul Kiram to Sultan Harun and Sulu Governor Arolas. Arolas responded that, to made submission possible, Amirul Kiram must surrender himself.

The Spanish conducted expeditions against Kadungdung, southern Lu’uk, and Pata Island. The troops faced numerous hardships and killed many Sulus. Sultan Harun cooperated with the Spanish and explored inaccessible areas. While it was believed that Amirul Kiram's partisans were defeated, this was not the case. In October 1887, Bwal and the northern Lu’uk district were punished, resulting in the evacuation of Sulus and the destruction of houses. In 1888, large-scale expeditions were conducted against various Sulu localities, leading to the deaths of hundreds or thousands of Sulus. Despite these efforts, Arolas's attempts to impose Sultan Harun on the people were unsuccessful.

=== End of rule ===
General Arolas was replaced by Col. Cesar Mattos and then Gen. Venancio Hernandez in 1893. Unlike Arolas, these successors saw Sultan Harun as weak and burdensome. In 1894, Sultan Harun was removed from power and returned to Palawan, where he later had one son, Datu Bataraza Narrazid, who succeeded him in ruling Palawan. During his time as sultan, Harun lived in Mubu, Jolo. He had ambitions for reform but lacked strong support from his people and faced constant struggles for allegiance. He was succeeded by Amirul Kiram, famously known as Jamalul Kiram II.

=== Governing in Palawan ===
After Harun left Sulu and settled in southern part of Palawan, he was given the authority to rule the Muslim population in Balabac, and other southern islands of Palawan, including the present-day areas of Brooke's Point (incl. Bataraza), Rizal, Quezon, and Sofronio Española. He established his main settlement center at Bono-Bono, Bataraza, and a smaller settlement center at Abo-Abo, Sofronio Española. Several settlements were built from Abo-Abo towards the south.

== Lifestyle as a sultan ==
Sultan Harun would wear luxurious European attire. For the sultan, having European elements in his clothing showed his political authority and to show Spanish authorities his status in Sulu.

He also embraced European etiquette and spoke with a military accent to showcase his power and authority.

== Death ==
He died in Palawan, where he was exiled, and was buried in Bono-Bono. Datu Bataraza Narrazid, as the eldest son, took over power after his father's death.
