= Mohammad Pulalun Kiram =

Mohammad Pulalun Kiram مُحَمَّدْ فُلَنُنْ كِرَمْ
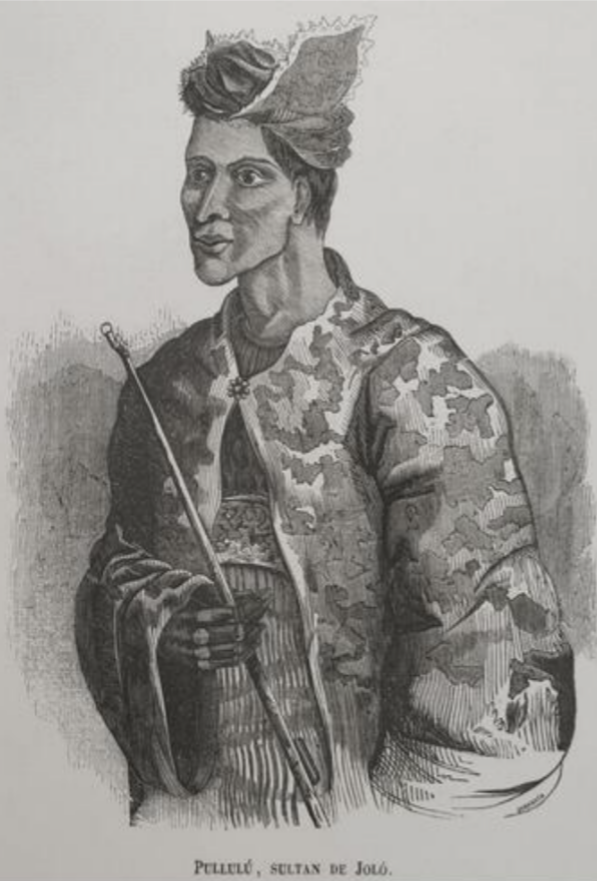
- Portrait engraving from "Los Héroes y las Grandezas de la Tierra" Volume VIII, published in 1856

Sultan of Sulu
- Reign: 1844–1862
- Predecessor: Jamalul Kiram I
- Successor: Jamal ul-Azam
- Born: between 1810s and 1820s Sultanate of Sulu
- Died: September 24, 1862 (probably in Jolo, Sultanate of Sulu)
- House: House of Kiram
- Father: Jamalul Kiram I
- Religion: Islam

Mohammad Pulalun Kiram (died 1862) was sultan of Sulu from 1844 to 1862. He succeeded his father, Jamalul Kiram I. During his reign, Spanish expedition to Sulu was led by Governor-General Narciso Claveria y Zaldua and subsequent conflict with the Spanish military under Governor-General Juan Antonio de Urbiztondo. As sultan, he was known for his political administration making the Royal House of Kiram extend its influence and fame among Sulus.

== Treaties ==
=== France ===
In 1844, the French concluded a treaty with the Sultan of Sulu to acquire Basilan Island in exchange for a significant amount of money. While the terms of this treaty were not fully implemented, it along with the presence of English, Dutch, and French vessels in Sulu waters prompted the Spaniards to take more aggressive measures to subjugate the Sulu Archipelago.

=== Great Britain ===
Sir James Brooke's treaty with Sultan Pulalun in 1849 was met with hostility from the Spanish colonial government. The treaty, which aimed to protect British commercial interests, was seen as an act disloyalty by Spain. The governor of Zamboanga protested to the sultan regarding this treaty, but the issue was not resolved, and the governor returned to Zamboanga without any results.

== Spanish expedition against Sulu ==
The presence of vessels from other European colonial powers beside Spain caused worry among Spanish officials along with the threats of piracy. The Spanish colonial government's lack of diplomacy with Great Britain and the Dutch hindered naval cooperation combatting Moro pirates. Governor-General Narciso Claveria y Zaldua made preparations of a fort in Basilan Island. Claveria also secured three war vessels namely the Elcano, Magallanes, and Reina de Castilla in 1848. These were the first steam gunboats acquired by the Philippine government.

=== Spain's conflict with the Sultanate of Sulu ===
In December 1850, Juan Antonio de Urbiztondo, Marquis of La Solana led a force of 600 troops, artillery, and other personnel to Zamboanga. They then proceeded to Belun, where they burned houses and vintas and defeated a small Moro force. The chief of Bukutwan surrendered, and the expedition encountered bad weather at Tonkil, forcing them to turn towards Jolo.

Due to this breach of peace between the two nations, the sultan fortified Jolo. The town was protected with trenches and provided with much artillery. The estimated population of the town at the time consist of 6,000 Moros and 500 Chinese.

The Spanish fleet, reaching Jolo, saluted and sent two officers to go ashore to know the presence of the Governor-General of the Philippines. The sultan and datus refused to meet the governor-general. The two officers returned and stated 10,000 men were protecting the town. Urbiztondo then retreated and sent a marine officer to Manila to further expand his forces.

The Spanish fleet returned once more to Jolo in February 27, 1851. Both the sultan's army and Spanish military have their guns and forts active. At the end of the war, the Sultanate of Sulu lost. Many Sulus fled while the Spanish military burned the whole town.

=== Treaty with Spain ===
Due to the destruction of Jolo, Sultan Pulalun, fearing for more destruction and loss of lives, made a peace treaty with the politico-military governor Col. José Maria de Carlos. This treaty assured the sultanate's friendship and agreement with the Spanish Crown.

Due to Spain's friendship with the Sultanate of Sulu, the sultan also agreed to reduce the threats of piracy in the Sulu Sea. The treaty also include that the sultanate must not make any further treaties with foreign powers except Spain. Spanish campaign against Moro pirates were very successful as it helped reduce piracy especially in the Sulu Sea.

== Death and legacy ==
Sultan Pulalun died in September 24, 1862. Among his subjects, he was admired for being fair and just. He was succeeded by his son, Jamal ul-Azam.

According to Najeeb Mitry Saleeby, the decline of Sulu was not because of "national retrogression or political dissension, but by the hostility and aggression of its adversary." The Spanish military further expanded its forts after Governor-General Jose Malcampo's expedition in 1876. The Spanish presence near Sulu were becoming more evident. It was not until the reign of Jamal ul-Azam that the occupation of Sulu by the Spaniards was inevitable.
