= Bantilan Muizzud-Din =

Bantilan Muizzud-Din بَنْتِلَنْ مُئِزُّدِانْ
- Sultan of Sulu
- Reign: 1748–1763
- Predecessor: Sultan Azim ud-Din I
- Successor: Sultan Azim ud-Din II
- Born: Unknown; Sulu Sultanate
- Died: 1763; Sulu Sultanate
- House: Maharajah Adinda
- Father: Sultan Badar ud-Din I
- Mother: Princess of the Tidung Kingdom
- Religion: Sunni Islam

Sultan Bantilan Muizzud-Din was the 20th Sultan of the Sulu Sultanate, reigning from 1748 to 1763. He was known as Datu or Pangiran Bantilan and was the younger brother of Sultan Azim ud-Din I. He is remembered for resisting foreign religious influence, strengthening Islamic governance in Sulu, and engaging in diplomatic treaties with European powers.

== Early life ==
Sultan Bantilan was born in the Sulu Sultanate, the son of Sultan Badar ud-Din I and a princess from the Tidung Kingdom of northeastern Borneo. He belonged to the Maharajah Adinda branch of the royal family, recognized as the second heir-apparent in the line of succession.

== Rise to power ==
In 1748, his brother, Sultan Azim ud-Din I, allowed Jesuit missionaries to propagate Christianity in Sulu. This was unpopular among the Muslim majority, leading to political unrest. When Azim ud-Din I left for Zamboanga and later Manila, Datu Bantilan was proclaimed Sultan by the royal court and adopted the regnal name Muizzud-Din.

== Reign ==
During his reign, Sultan Bantilan Muizzud-Din restructured the administrative cabinet and emphasized Islamic governance. He strengthened the sultanate's internal defenses and worked to uphold the sovereignty of the Muslim community.

=== Relations with foreign powers ===
In 1762, he signed treaties with Alexander Dalrymple of the British East India Company. One significant outcome was the cession of Balambangan Island, which the British intended to develop as a trading post connecting Southeast Asia to China.

== Death and succession ==
Sultan Bantilan died in 1763. His son, Azim ud-Din II, eventually succeeded him. Although Sultan Azim ud-Din I was restored briefly with British assistance in 1764, the throne was reclaimed by Azim ud-Din II in 1778.

== Legacy ==
Sultan Bantilan Muizzud-Din is remembered as a defender of Islam in the Sulu Sultanate and a key figure in resisting European colonial and religious encroachment. His administrative reforms and foreign treaties had long-term effects on the political dynamics of Sulu and its regional relations.
