= Kamal ud-Din of Sulu =

Sultan of the Sulu Sultanate from 1480 to 1505

Kamal ud-Din كَمَلُدِّنْ
- Sultan of the Sulu Sultanate
- Reign: 1480 – 1505
- Predecessor: Sharif ul-Hāshim
- Successor: Amir ul-Umara
- Religion: Sunni Islam

Kamal ud-Din (reigned 1480 – 1505) was the second Sultan of Sulu.

The eldest son of his predecessor, Sharif ul-Hāshim, Kamal ud-Din became Sultan on the death of his father in 1480. During his reign, he appointed qadi to administer justice and oversaw the conversion of people in Luzon and the Visayas. He died in 1505 and is buried in a grave, marked by a stone slab, near to Buasa. He was succeeded by his son, Amir ul-Umara.

== See also ==
- Sultans of Sulu

Regnal titles
Preceded by Sharif ul-Hāshim	Sultan of Sulu; 1480–1505	Succeeded by Amir ul-Umara
