= Batara Shah Tengah =

Batarah Shah Tengah
- Sultan of Sulu
- Reign: 1596–1608 or 1585–1600
- Coronation: 1596 or 1585
- Predecessor: Sultan Muhammad ul-Halim
- Successor: Sultan Muwallil Wasit
- Issue: Died without heir
- Sultan Pangiran Batara Shah Tengah Tindig
- Religion: Sunni Islam

Sultan Batara Shah Tengah (also known as Pangiran Tindig or Pangiran Tengah) was the 8th Sultan of Sulu. He reigned from 1596 to 1608, although some Sulu tarsilahs (genealogical records) state that his reign lasted from 1585 to 1600. He was the son of the previous sultan, Muhammad ul-Halim, also known as Pangiran Buddiman.

The title Batara in his name is a reference to Brunei annals, which used the term to identify rulers of Sulu, reflecting the intermarriage between the two royal houses. Shah may have been either his given name or an additional royal title, referencing the Persian royal designation. Tengah was another title, or an indication of birth order, signifying that he was positioned between an older and a younger brother.

During his reign, he was regarded as an intelligent and respected ruler of Sulu, as well as an advocate of Sharia law within his domains. His rule marked the end of the first phase of the Spanish–Moro conflict, a struggle that would last for three centuries during the Spanish colonisation of the Philippines. Moro raiding also became more frequent under his reign, with slave-raiding parties from among his subjects in Sulu attacking and devastating coastal settlements in the Philippines and surrounding areas.

== Early life ==
During his father's reign, Sulu gained de facto independence and trading rights from the Bruneian Empire. In 1578, the same year Sulu asserted its independence, the Spaniards launched a military expedition that resulted in Pangiran Buddiman agreeing to send a regular tribute of pearls from Sulu to Spanish Manila. However, due to subsequent military expeditions carried out by the now independent Sulu Sultanate in and around the Visayas, no such tribute was delivered during Buddiman's reign, nor during the reigns of his successors.

Very little is known about Tengah's early life in Sulu. It is recorded that he was the second of three sons, with an unspecified number of sisters. The fate of these other possible heirs to the Sultanate remains unclear. As an official prince of Sulu, he was granted the princely title Pangiran, which was traditionally given to all potential heirs to the sultanate. He was a direct descendant of the first rulers of Sulu.

== Reign ==
=== Accession to the throne ===
Some Sulu genealogies place the beginning of his reign in 1585, while others state 1596. Regardless of the exact date, it is recorded that he was crowned and proclaimed Sultan soon after his father's death. His coronation was recognised by the various chiefs or datus of Sulu, who became his subjects.

=== Administration ===
His reign saw little reform in the Sulu ruling and kinship system, which had been established nearly a century earlier by his ancestors. However, the independence of the Sultanate brought significant economic growth and strengthened its presence in the region. Sultan Tengah used this economic rise to his advantage, securing the loyalty of numerous chiefs and subordinate rulers. He no longer depended on Brunei’s economy or military support, nor was he required to pay tribute to Brunei, making his domains increasingly wealthy. He was described as a wise and intelligent ruler, and was noted for maintaining a clean and presentable appearance, which reportedly reflected the Sultanate’s efforts to demonstrate its capacity for self-governance to Brunei and to present a cultured image to the Spaniards.

==== Sharia law ====
Tengah also acted as a judge for his people and was recognised for his knowledge of Sharia law, which he applied in governance. His reign has been described as Islamic-oriented, as Sharia law was widely implemented across his domains.

==== Relations with Brunei ====
Although Sulu had gained de facto independence from Brunei following Spanish attempts to weaken Brunei’s influence, relations between the two states remained close. Sultan Tengah arranged the marriage of his sister to Sultan Hassan of Brunei, and he himself adopted the title Batara, a Bruneian designation for Sulu royalty. Marriage alliances were a common diplomatic practice at the time, often signifying the superiority of the receiving party.

Islam further reinforced the bond between the two Sultanates. Religious teachers, or panditas, frequently travelled from Brunei to Sulu to spread Islamic teachings. The marriage between Sultan Hassan of Brunei and a Sulu princess produced a son, Muwallil Wasit (also known as Rajah Bongsu), who later became Sultan of Sulu after Tengah's death.

From Muwallil Wasit, the line continued through his son Sultan Salahuddin Karamat (also known as Pangiran Bakhtiar), followed by Sultan Badaruddin I. His descendants from two different marriages formed distinct family branches: the Kiram and Shakiraullah families, symbolised by the keris on the Sulu flag, and the Maharajah Adinda families, symbolised by the spear on the flag. The Maharajah Adinda lineage preserved the royal relic (pusaka) known as the Pulau Janggi (also called Sepoh Janggi or coco de mer seed), which was later entrusted in 1978 to the Brunei Museums for safekeeping.

==== Relations with Spain ====
Upon his accession, Sultan Tengah inherited both an independent and economically stable state, as well as his father’s conflict with Spain. Since the beginning of Spanish colonisation of the Philippines, the Muslim polities of the south had come into conflict with the Spanish, who sought to expand their influence. Although Tengah was not inclined towards military campaigns, his reign was marked by repeated Spanish attempts to subdue Sulu.

The last major Spanish expedition to Sulu prior to his reign took place in 1579 under Captain Juan Acre de Sadornil, which was decisively repelled by Sulu forces. In 1593, however, the Spaniards succeeded in establishing a Jesuit mission at Caldera Bay (present-day Recodo, Zamboanga City). The settlement, known as Samboangan (from the Sama word Sabuan, meaning "docking point"), was short-lived due to fierce Moro resistance.

When Tengah ascended the throne around 1596, the Spaniards launched another expedition against Sulu, attacking its capital, Bauang (later renamed Jolo). The campaign was repelled by Sulu forces led by Tengah's nephew, Rajah Bongsu (Muwallil Wasit), who had been sent from Brunei to assist militarily. For his role, Rajah Bongsu was granted the title Adapati ("protector") of Sulu, while Tengah remained as Sultan.

In November 1596, the Spanish governor in Manila, Juan Ronquillo, established a garrison in Tampakan to counter the growing frequency of Moro slave raids, but it was abandoned the following year and relocated to Caldera Bay in the Zamboanga Peninsula.

Another expedition was sent by the Spaniards in 1598, but logistical difficulties forced them to retreat to Manila without engaging Sulu forces. This marked the last major Spanish offensive against Sulu during Tengah's reign and the end of the first phase of the Spanish–Moro wars. Slave raiding, however, continued under Tengah, providing substantial economic benefits to the Sultanate.

=== Dynastic disputes ===
Early in his reign, a cousin identified only as Adasaolan is believed to have attempted to usurp the throne. Because of these dynastic challenges, Sultan Tengah relied on his nephew, Rajah Bongsu (Muwallil Wasit), to defend Sulu—particularly in 1596, when Tengah, newly crowned as ruler, faced a Spanish expedition. Tengah was not known as a military leader and often preferred to resolve disputes within his domains through peaceful and diplomatic means.

After the failure of the Spanish expedition, Muwallil Wasit returned to Brunei to rejoin his family, while Sultan Tengah continued to protect his throne against Adasaolan. To strengthen his claim, Adasaolan reportedly married a Maguindanao princess. Despite this, Tengah, who was favoured by Brunei and held in higher regard by the people of Sulu, maintained his position and continued to rule the Sultanate.

== Issue and death ==
Sultan Batara Shah Tengah had no known children and therefore left no direct heir. Sulu remained relatively stable during the latter part of his reign, with continued economic growth and the suppression of internal threats, including his usurper. However, the succession remained uncertain, as there was no clear candidate for the throne.

Upon his death in 1608, Brunei, concerned about the possibility of renewed dynastic conflict due to the absence of a ruler, dispatched Pangiran Muwallil Wasit to Sulu to claim the throne. A capable military leader, Muwallil Wasit inherited a growing and increasingly powerful Sultanate.
