= Ismael Kiram II =

Pretender to the Sulu Sultanate (1939–2015)

Esmail Kiram II إِسْمَئِلْ كِرَمْ ٢

Pretender to the Sulu Sultanate
- Pretence: 12 March 2001 – 19 September 2015
- Predecessor: Mohammad Akijal Atti
- Successor: Agbimuddin Kiram (until his death in January 2015)
- Born: 9 November 1939; Maimbung, Sulu, Commonwealth of the Philippines
- Died: 19 September 2015 (aged 75); Maimbung, Sulu
- House: Royal House of Kiram
- Father: Datu Punjungan Kiram
- Mother: Sharif Usna Dalus Strattan
- Religion: Sunni Islam

Ismael ibni Punjungan Kiram II (also spelled as Esmail Kiram II) (9 November 1939 – 19 September 2015) was a self-proclaimed Sultan of the Sultanate of Sulu (now part of Philippines, Malaysia and Indonesia) from 12 March 2001 until his death on 19 September 2015.

== Biography ==
Jamalul Kiram III was subsequently abdicated for leaving Sulu after his coronation in 1986. Self-proclaimed Sultan, Jamalul likewise abrogated the authority of the Philippine government to retake Sabah from Malaysia in 1989. Jamalul Kiram III's death changes nothing in the hierarchy, being an abdicated sultan was allowed to undertake the supposed homecoming of Raja Muda Agbimuddin Kiram in Sabah, which turn bloody when the Malaysian forces rounded up the group of Raja Muda Agbimuddin when they illegally intrude Sabah. Around 68 of his followers died during the standoff. Shortly after, upon the death of Jamalul Kiram III, Agbimuddin Kiram was restored as Rajah Muda of Esmail Kiram II being mistaken next in line to Jamalul Kiram III to the succession of the throne. Esmail D. Kiram II, through no approval of the Royal House of Kiram. He proclaimed himself as Sultan in 1999 and was subsequently crowned on 12 March 2001, as his older brother Jamalul Kiram III moved to Manila after his coronation in 1986 for the latter's dialysis treatment. Other unrecognised heirs and pretenders to the throne continue to claim the heritage of the now-politically defunct but traditionally and culturally alive sultanate. He is the younger brother of Jamalul Kiram III who were both sons of Datu Punjungan Kiram the second son of late Sultan Mawallil Wasit.

In November 2012, Jamalul Kiram III was elected to take over Sabah, as leader being abdicated is regarded as Sultan of Sulu. Ismael Kiram II allowed him as his co-coregent, as Jamalul lives in Taguig, Metro Manila, far away from Sulu. Ismael, as the reigning sultan, administers the sultanate's court in Sulu. The nonexistent title was used to address Esmail as "Sultan Bantilan" or "Caretaker Sultan" of Sulu however it was a violation of the law of succession to be called caretaker. This neglect, or intentional attempt to diminish the Giba tradition, as seen with false claimants to the Sultanate of Sulu, has caused many to question the authenticity of his claim to the throne, as well as his disregard for these crucial cultural practices. Most of the claimants have either undermined, forgotten, or failed to preserve the significance of the Giba tradition. When he died in 2015, he was succeeded by the new sultan, Phugdalon Kiram II.

Ismael Kiram II Royal House of Sulu
Titles in pretence
Preceded by Mohammad Akijal Atti	— TITULAR — Regent Sultan of Sulu; 1999 with Jamalul Kiram III as self-proclaimed Sultan of Sulu 1986 to 2000 abdicated after 14 years for violation of the law of succession Reason for succession failure: Sultanate abolished in 1915	Incumbent; Heir: Agbimuddin Kiram (until his death in January 2015)
