= Juan Antonio de Urbiztondo, Marquis of La Solana =

Spanish military and Marquis of La Solana

General The Most Excellent The Marquis of La Solana OIC
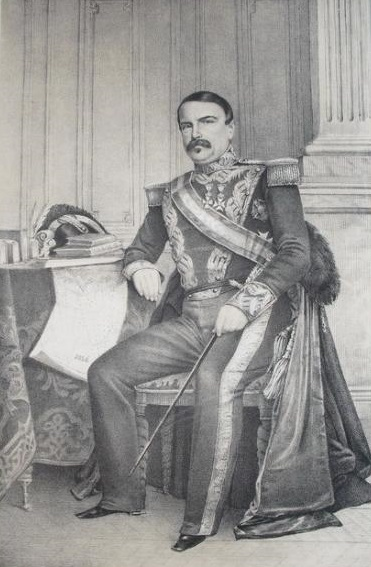

Minister of War of the Kingdom of Spain
- In office 12 October 1856 – 16 December 1856
- Monarch: Isabella II of Spain
- Preceded by: Fernando Fernández de Cordova
- Succeeded by: Francisco de Paula Figueras

73rd Governor-General of the Philippines
- In office 29 July 1850 – 20 December 1853
- Monarch: Isabella II of Spain
- Preceded by: Antonio María Blanco
- Succeeded by: Ramón Montero y Blandino

Personal details
- Born: Juan Antonio de Urbiztondo y Eguía; 7 January 1803 San Sebastián, Gipuzkoa, Spain
- Died: 26 April 1857 (aged 54) Madrid, Spain
- Occupation: Military officer Governor-General of the Philippines (1850–53)

Juan Antonio de Urbiztondo y Eguía (7 January 1803, San Sebastián – 26 April 1857, Madrid) was a Spanish military and the marquis of La Solana. In 1814 he became a knight's page in the Spanish Army, fought against the government of Trienio Liberal, and then became the inspector of the Royalist Volunteers. Madrid historians mentioned Urbiztondo's participation to a dispute at the Royal Palace of Madrid, which involved the Duke of Cádiz, the Duke of Valencia and Joaquín Osorio y Silva-Bazán (who was killed by Urbiztondo).

In 1833 he was imprisoned at Mérida due to the accusation that he is supposed-to-be connection to Carlism, but he managed to escape to Portugal.

He became the Spanish Governor-General of the Philippines from 1850 to 1853.

== Expedition against the Sultanate of Sulu ==
In December 1850, Urbiztondo led a naval expedition to the Sulu Archipelago. They visited several islands, causing destruction and casualties. Upon reaching Jolo, they faced hostility from Sultan Mohammad Pulalun Kiram and failed to obtain any concessions. Unable to invade the fortified city, they sailed to Tunkil and conducted a raid, resulting in more casualties and destruction.

In April 1851, the Sultan of Sulu signed a treaty with Spain recognizing Spanish sovereignty over the Sulu Sultanate and its dependencies. The treaty also allowed Spain to establish a trading factory and a naval station in Jolo.
