= Court of Appeal of Paris =

French court

Coordinates: 48.856°N 2.345°E

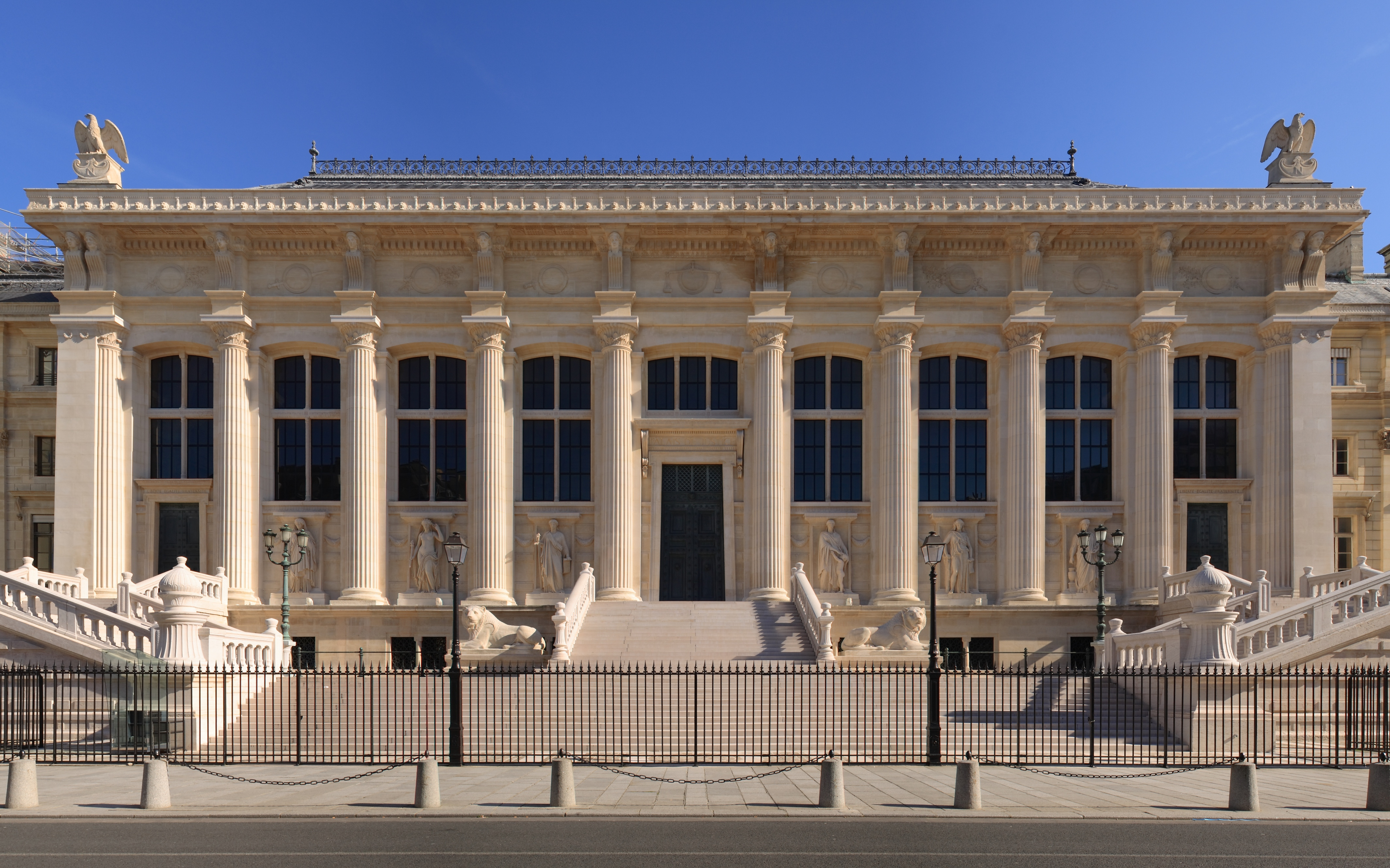
The Palais de Justice, Paris, seat of the Court of Appeal of Paris

The Court of Appeal of Paris (French: Cour d'appel de Paris, [kuʁ dapɛl də paʁi]) is the largest appeals court in France in terms of the number of cases brought before it. Its jurisdiction covers the departments of Paris, Essonne, Yonne, Seine-et-Marne, Seine-Saint-Denis, and Val-de-Marne.

The Court is housed in the Palais de Justice of Paris. Jacques Degrandi has been the president of the Court since 2010.

== See also ==
- Court of Cassation (France)
- Judiciary of France
- The Malaysia-Sulu Case
