= Azim ud-Din II of Sulu =

Azim ud-Din II
- Sultan of Sulu
- Reign: 1763–1764; 1778–1791
- Coronation: 1778
- Predecessor: Sultan Bantilan Muizz ud-Din; Sultan Azim ud-Din I
- Successor: Sultan Muhammad Israil ud-Din; Sultan Sharaf ud-Din
- Sultan Maharajah Adinda Bantilan Azim ud-Din
- House: Maharajah Adinda
- Religion: Sunni Islam

Sultan Azim ud-Din II (reigned 1763–1764, 1778–1791), was the 21st Sultan of Sulu. He was the son of Sultan Bantilan Muizz ud-Din, and cousin to Sultan Muhammad Israil ud-Din.

After the death of Sultan Bantilan Muizz ud-Din in 1763, he became the Sultan of Sulu; which lasted until 1764 when the British forced the restoration of the former Sultan Azim ud-Din I.

In 1778, he poisoned his cousin and the reigning Sultan Muhammad Israil ud-Din which led to his proclamation as the new sultan for the second time.

Royal titles
Preceded by Sultan Muhammad Israil ud-Din	Sultan of Sulu; 1778–1791	Succeeded by Sultan Sharaf ud-Din
Preceded by Sultan Bantilan Muizz ud-Din	Sultan of Sulu; 1763–1764	Succeeded by Sultan Azim ud-Din I
