= Azim ud-Din I of Sulu =

Azim ud-Din I (Ferdinand I)
- Sultan of Sulu
- Reign: 1735–1748; 1764–1774
- Coronation: 1735 and 1764
- Predecessor: Sultan Nasar ud-Din; Sultan Azim ud-Din II
- Successor: Sultan Bantilan Muizz ud-Din; Sultan Muhammad Israil
Names
- Sultan Amirul M'umimin Maharajah Adinda Azim ud-Din
- House: Maharajah Adinda
- Religion: Sunni Islam briefly Christianity

Muhammad Azim ud-Din I (Arabic: مُحَمَّدعلیم الدین, Jawi: محمدعلیم الدیند; also Muhammad Alimuddin, Christian name: Don Fernando de Alimuddin) was Sultan of Sulu from 1735 to 1748, and again from 1764 until his abdication in 1774. He was briefly converted to Christianity under the name Fernando.

== Early life ==
The young Alimuddin initially attended the school of his father, Badar ud-Din I, and was later sent to Batavia, Dutch East Indies, to complete his education. There he became proficient in Arabic and Malay, and gained mastery of the Qur'an.

== First reign ==
Azim ud-Din I acceded the throne in 1732 after his father abdicated, but only assumed full powers and formal recognition in 1735 when his cousin, Nasar ud-Din, abandoned claims to the throne. One of the earliest events in the reign of Azim ud-Din I was his ratification of the Treaty of 1737. He was represented in Manila by Datu Mohammad Ismael and Datu Ja'far, who both signed the document. The treaty, drawn in January 1737 by Governor-General Fernando Valdes y Tamon, contained five articles: first, the preservation of permanent peace between the two states; second, the provision for alliance and mutual aid against any foreign foe; third, free trade between the two states; fourth, responsibility of each state for all infractions of the peace; and fifth, provision for the exchange of captives and return of all church images and ornaments.

=== Abdication ===
On 12 July 1744, Philip V of Spain sent him a letter requesting permission for missionaries from the Society of Jesus to propagate Christianity in the southern Philippines. When his panditas learnt that he had given his assent, they raised fierce opposition. A party was formed under the leadership of the Sultan's brother, Prince Bantilan, for the purpose of expelling the missionaries and deposing Azim ud-Din I. Hostilities increased and civil war became imminent.

Bantilan tried to assassinate the Sultan by thrusting a spear at him, inflicting a severe wound on his side or thigh. In the ensuing unrest, it became too dangerous for the missionaries to remain in Jolo. Overpowered, disheartened, and grieved, Azim ud-Din I fled Jolo with his family and retinue for Zamboanga, where he sought the aid of Spain against Bantilan's unopposed seizure of power. Bantilan did not expel the Jesuits but he gave them no opportunity to accomplish their mission.

=== Conversion to Christianity ===
Azim ud-Din I travelled to Cavite on 2 January 1749. In Manila, Governor-General Juan de Arechederra, Bishop of Nueva Segovia, gave him a reception befitting a prince of high rank. The Sultan was publicly received in the Hall of the Audiencia, but instead of immediately addressing the issue of his usurpation, he told Arechederra that he wanted to be instructed in the Christian faith preparatory to receiving the Sacrament of Baptism to the latter's great joy. He was baptised in 1750, taking the name Fernando de Alimuddin, with the regnal name of Ferdinand I (Spanish: Fernando 1.° de Sulú).

The new Governor-General, the Marquis of Brindisi and Ovando, promised now Ferdinand I that the Spanish would restore him to the throne and punish Bantilan and his pirates. It is unclear whether Ferdinand I embraced Christianity sincerely or merely as a political move, a matter held in doubt by the Spanish.

== Second reign ==
Before leaving Manila in 1751 to return to Sulu, Ferdinand I wrote a letter in Arabic addressed to Muhammad Khair ud-Din Amir ud-Din Itamza, Sultan of Maguindanao, on behalf of the Marquis of Ovando. However, inconsistent translations into Spanish led to allegations that he had advocated treason in the letter. He was subsequently arrested and imprisoned for ten years on charges of treason.

Ferdinand I remained in prison until Great Britain captured and occupied Manila during the Seven Years' War in 1762. The following year, he was restored to the throne by the British, upon whose departure from Manila after the signing of the Treaty of Paris saw raids by Sulu pirates on the city intensify.

After Sultan Bantilan had died, Bantilan's son, Azim ud-Din II, took power, and upon the latter's death Ferdinand I returned to Sulu. He was welcomed by his people. In November 1773, he abdicated the throne in favour of his son, Israil.

== Legacy ==
Azim ud-Din I is one of the more beloved monarchs of Sulu, regarded to be a man of peace and a reformer. He kept his end of the Treaty of 1737 faithfully and was actually obliterated during the whole period he held the reins of government. He also minted money, organised an army and tried to establish a navy.

He had a reputation amongst his subjects as "an authority almost supreme," earning him the title "Chief of Pandita" for his erudite and precise explanations of the Qur'an. He revised the sultanate's legal code and its justice system, and initiated translation of portions of the Qur'an and several legal and religious into the local language. He strongly urged his government to observe their religion faithfully, and wanted all panditas to learn Arabic, initiating the drafting of a vocabulary of Islamic terms as a preliminary step into making Arabic the official language of the state.

== See also ==
- History of the Philippines
