= Jamalul Kiram I =

Jamalul Kiram I جَمَلُلْ كِرَمْ ١

Sultan of Sulu
- Reign: 1823–1844
- Predecessor: Shakirul-Lah
- Successor: Mohammad Pulalun Kiram
- Died: 1844

Sultan Jamalul-Kiram I was a Sultan of Sulu from 1823 to 1844. As per some sources, his real name was Muwalil Wasit (cousin to Brunei Sultan Nasiruddin). Muwalil Wasit was the son of Alimud-Din III.

The Sultan died in 1844.

== See also ==
- List of sultans of Sulu
