= Malaysia Sulu case =

2019–2024 succession dispute

Heirs to the Sultanate of Sulu v. Malaysia
- Court: Court of Cassation
- Decided: 28 February 2022

Case history
- Prior actions: Arbitration in Spain. Challenge to Arbitration case first filed at the Superior Court of Justice of Madrid; Seat of arbitration moved to Paris. Challenge to arbitration in the Paris Court
- Appealed to: Court of Appeal of Paris then Court of Cassation
- Subsequent action: French courts held that Arbitrator lacked jurisdiction over the case (July 2023, November 2024)
- Related actions: Government of Malaysia v Nurhima Kiram Forman & Ors (2020) – High Court in Sabah and Sarawak; Nullification of Stampa's appointment (2021) – Madrid High Court

Case opinions
- Decision by: Court of Cassation

The Malaysia Sulu case is an international legal dispute in which persons claiming to be heirs of the Sultanate of Sulu made claims against the government of Malaysia by way of arbitration. The claims were subsequently litigated in the Spanish, French, and Dutch court systems. Malaysia obtained a final victory in the French Court of Cassation on 6 November 2024.

== Background ==
The North Borneo dispute arose from an agreement between the now defunct Sultanate of Sulu and the British North Borneo Company (BNBC) in 1878. Under the agreement the Sultan of Sulu either ceded or leased land in North Borneo to the BNBC, which agreed to pay the Sultan and his heirs an annual fee. (Note: There is a dispute whether this is a cession or a lease fee. Malaysia interprets it as the former, while the Philippines, which lays territorial claim to North Borneo, treats it as the latter.)

After its formation in 1963, Malaysia, as the successor to the BNBC, paid the heirs of the Sulu Sultanate an annual fee until the 2013 Lahad Datu standoff. Persons claiming to be Sulu heirs claimed that they were not involved with the standoff and sought arbitration.

== Case history ==
=== Case in Madrid ===
The Sulu heirs started an ad hoc arbitration process regarding the 1878 agreement in Spain on 30 July 2019. Malaysia did not consent to the arbitration process, insisting that the proper venue to resolve the dispute was the Courts of Malaysia, Malaysia being the successor to the British Colonial administration in the relevant territory.

In December 2019, the Government of Malaysia commenced proceedings to stop the arbitration.

The Malaysian Government argued that the dispute must be resolved in accordance with the Deed of Cession, which provided as follows: "In case of any dispute shall arise between His Highness the Sultan, his heirs or successors and the said Gustavus Baron de Overbeck or his Company it is hereby agreed that the matter shall be submitted to Her Britannic Majesty's Consul-General for Borneo." Malaysia contended that, as it is the successor to the former British administration in the relevant territory, its courts must be the forum for resolution of the dispute.

Gonzalo Stampa accepted an appointment as arbitrator in the case, but Malaysia did not consent to this appointment. On 25 May 2020, Stampa granted a partial award to the Sulu heirs. The Madrid High Court in June 2021 annulled Stampa's appointment due to failure to properly notify Malaysia about the case. Malaysia, as noted above, challenged arbitral jurisdiction.

=== Move to Paris and final award ===
After the Order of the Court in Madrid, Stampa moved the seat of the arbitration to Paris, in an attempt to circumvent that order. In February 2022, Stampa issued an award holding that Malaysia owed the Sulu heirs $14.92 billion.

==== Malaysian appeal and assets seizing attempt ====
Malaysia obtained a favourable ruling from the Court of Appeal of Paris on 6 July 2023, holding that the arbitrator had no jurisdiction over the dispute. Malaysia had previously obtained a stay order to prevent the enforcement of the final award in the French court system.

The Sulu heirs made failed attempts to enforce the award against Malaysian assets in France, the Netherlands, and Luxembourg.

On 6 November 2024, the Cour de Cassation of France dismissed an appeal by the Sulu heirs, finding in favour of Malaysia.

The court declared the arbitration clause in the case invalid because it appointed the long-defunct British Consul General in Brunei as arbitrator. The decision also underscored the need for international arbitration agreements to be interpreted in accordance with the principles of good faith and utility, "without reference to the law of any State". A number of international experts welcomed the observation, including University of Paris Cité Professor Caroline Kleiner who called it a major shift in arbitration law and hearing. In her review carried by Kluwer Law International, Keleiner said the decision would help French courts participate in the development of international law on the enforcement of foreign arbitral awards per a universalist approach, rather than the trend of exceptionalism that is currently being pursued.

==== Stampa criminal case ====
The arbitrator, Gonzalo Stampa, faced a criminal charge of "unqualified professional practice" in Spain in December 2023. Stampa was found guilty of contempt of court and was sentenced by the Spanish courts to six months in prison together with a ban from practising as an arbitrator for a year. On 17 May 2024, the Madrid Court of Appeal upheld the Madrid Criminal Court's 2023 judgement finding Stampa guilty of contempt of court.

== Claimants ==
According to the Malaysian government, the following are the alleged heirs involved in the Sulu case, said to be Philippine citizens:

- Nurhima Kiram Fornan
- Fuad A. Kiram
- Sheramar T. Kiram
- Permaisuli Kiram–Guerzon
- Taj–Mahal Kiram–Tarsum Nuqui;
- Ahmad Nazard Kiram Sampang (d. 2023)
- Jenny K.A. Sampang
- Widz–Raunda Kiram Sampang

== Reactions ==
Malaysia viewed the claim by the Sulu heirs as a violation of its sovereignty, seeking arbitration without its consent. Stampa and the Sulu heirs have been criticised for forum shopping.

In mid-2023, Malaysian parliament member Khlir Mohd Nor, who believes that the Philippine government was involved in the 2013 Lahad Datu standoff alleged that the Philippine government was involved in the Sulu case. Prime Minister Anwar Ibrahim who had met with Philippine President Bongbong Marcos said that the Philippine government is not involved in the Sulu case and reiterated Malaysian policy of not entertaining claims on the sovereignty over Sabah.

Malaysia welcomed the Cour de Cassation's ruling as a "historic victory". several publications, including Law.com and Law360 saw the ruling as a significant "win" for Malaysia. Former vice chairman of the Democratic National Committee and Minnesota attorney general Keith Ellison said the case highlighted the enormous scope for "corruption and foreign influence operations to subvert arbitration proceedings".
