= Sharif ul-Hāshim of Sulu =

1st Sultan of the Sulu Sultanate from 1405 to 1480

Sharif ul-Hāshim شريف الهاشم
- 1st Sultan of the Sulu Sultanate
- Reign: 17 November 1405 – ?
- Predecessor: Rajah Baguinda Ali
- Successor: Kamal ud-Din of Sulu
- Born: Johor, Johor Empire
- Spouse: Dayang-dayang Paramisuli
- Issue: Sultan Sharif Kamal ud-Din; Sultan Sharif Ala ud-Din
Names
- Sharif Abubakar ibn Abirin Al Hashmi
- House: Al-'Aydarus Ba 'Alawi sada
- Religion: Sunni Islam Ash'ari Shafi'i Sufism

Sharif Abubakar Abirin Al-Hashmi (17 November 1405 – ?), better known by his regnal name Sharif ul-Hashim, was the founder and first Sultan of Sulu.

During his reigning era, he promulgated the first Sulu code of laws called Diwan that were based on Quran. He introduced Islamic political institutions and the consolidation of Islam as the state religion.

== Origins and personal life ==
Very little is known about the Sunni Sufi scholar Sharif ul-Hashim's early life. Born in Johore (in present-day Malaysia), his proper name was known to be Sayyid Abu Bakr bin Abirin Al-Hashmi, while his regal name was known as Paduka Mahasari Maulana al Sultan Sharif ul-Hashim (Arabic: مولانا السلطان المبجل شريف الهاشم), or "The Master (Paduka) His Majesty (Mahasari), Protector (Maulana) and (al) Sultan (Sultan), Sharif (Sharif) of (ul-) Hashim (Hashim)". [The Sharif of Hashim part is a reference to his nobility as a descendant of Hashim clan, a clan the Islamic prophet Muhammad was a part of.] His regnal name is often shortened to Sharif ul-Hashim. He was a scholar of the Shafi'i Madh'hab and the Ash'ari Aqeeda.

Abubakar bin Abirin bore the titles Sayyid (alternatively spelled Saiyid, Sayyed, Seyyed, Sayed, Seyed, Syed, Seyd) and Shareef, an honorific that denotes he was an accepted descendant of the Islamic prophet Muhammad through both the Imams Hassan and Hussain. His name is also alternatively spelled Sayyid wal-Shareef Abu Bakr ibn Abirin Al-Hashmi. He was a Najeeb Al-Tarfayn Sayyid.

The genealogy of Sultan Sharif ul-Hashim describes him as a descendant of Muhammad, through his maternal bloodline, Sayyed Zainul Abidin of Hadhramaut, Yemen, who belongs to the fourteenth generation of Hussain, the grandson of Muhammad. He was from the Ba 'Alawiyya of Yemen, along with the other known missionaries locally known as 'Lumpang Basih'.

=== Descendants ===
Sultan Sharif Ul-Hashim's descendants include:

- Sharif Kamal ud-Din, his eldest son and successor, reigning from 1480–1505.
- Sultan Sharif Ala ud-Din, his son, not proclaimed as sultan of Sulu.
- Sultan Sharif Mu-izz ul-Mutawadi-in, his grandson, who was sultan from 1527–1548.

== See also ==
- Sharif ‘Ali ibn ‘Ajlan ibn Rumaithah ibn Muhammad
- Sultans of Sulu

Regnal titles
Preceded by Office Established	Sultan of Sulu; 1450–1480	Succeeded by Kamal ud-Din of Sulu
