= Legislative districts of Mindanao and Sulu =

Legislative Districts of the Philippines

The legislative district of Mindanao and Sulu was the collective representation of the Department of Mindanao and Sulu and its component provinces of Agusan, Bukidnon, Cotabato, Davao, Lanao, Sulu and Zamboanga as a single at-large district in the lower house of the Philippine Legislature from 1916 until 1935.

Coat of Arms of the Department of Mindanao and Sulu

== History ==
Initially being excluded from representation in the lower house of the Philippine Legislature in 1907, the then-non-Christian-majority areas of the Philippines — which included the Department of Mindanao and Sulu's seven component provinces; Nueva Vizcaya; the Mountain Province; and Baguio — were finally extended legislative representation with the passage of the Philippine Autonomy Act in 1916 by the United States Congress. The Revised Administrative Code (Act No. 2711) enacted on March 10, 1917, further elaborated on the manner by which these areas would be represented. The non-Christian areas were to be collectively represented in the upper house's 12th senatorial district by two senators, both appointed by the Governor-General. Five assembly members, also appointed by the Governor-General, were to represent the seven component provinces of Department of Mindanao and Sulu — Agusan, Bukidnon, Cotabato, Davao, Lanao, Sulu and Zamboanga — in the lower house as a single at-large district. The appointment of these members of the Legislature did not require the consent of the upper house; the appointive legislators were also not necessarily required to be residents of the areas they represented. For example, Assemblyman Pedro Aunario, a resident of Manila, and Senator Lope K. Santos, a resident of Rizal, were among the representatives of the Mountain Province.

These arrangements remained in place despite the abolition of the Department in 1920. It lasted until 1935, when each of the seven provinces was finally provided one representative to the National Assembly of the Philippines, albeit the manner of election varying between provinces. Voters of the more Christianized provinces of Agusan, Bukidnon, Davao and Zamboanga could elect their representative through popular vote by virtue of Article VI, Section 1 of the 1935 Constitution. In the Muslim-dominated provinces of Cotabato, Lanao and Sulu, however, voter qualifications were more restrictive: the only persons allowed to vote for the province's representative were past and present municipal officials (municipal president, vice-president, municipal councilors); present senators, assembly representatives and 1935 Constitutional Convention delegates; provincial governors and members of provincial boards; and any persons currently residing in the concerned province who held any of the aforementioned positions in the past.

== At-Large (defunct) ==
Period	Representatives				
4th Philippine Legislature; 1916–1919^{1}	Rafael Acuña Villaruz	Datu Piang	Teodoro Palma Gil	Datu Benito	Pablo Lorenzo
5th Philippine Legislature; 1919–1922	Isidro Vamenta^{2}	Datu Piang	Teodoro Palma Gil	Datu Tampugao	Pablo Lorenzo
5th Philippine Legislature; 1919–1922	Julius Schuck^{3}	Datu Piang	Teodoro Palma Gil	Datu Tampugao	Pablo Lorenzo
6th Philippine Legislature; 1922–1925	Rafael Acuña Villaruz	Ugalingan Piang	Teodoro Palma Gil	Datu Tampugao	Pablo Lorenzo
7th Philippine Legislature; 1925–1928	Pedro de la Llana	Abdullah Piang	Arsenio Suazo	Jose P. Melencio	(vacant)
8th Philippine Legislature; 1928–1931	Jose G. Sanvictores	Mónico R. Mercado	Jose Artadi	Jose P. Melencio	Tabahur Taupan
9th Philippine Legislature; 1931–1934	Jose G. Sanvictores	Datu Sinsuat	Francisco Bangoy	Datu Ibra Gundarangin	Agustin Luceo Alvarez
10th Philippine Legislature; 1934–1935	Manuel Fortich	Julian A. Rodriguez	Doroteo Karagdag	Alauya Alonto	Ombra Amilbangsa

^1 Representatives only assumed office in 1917 after appointment by the Governor-General, pursuant to the provisions of Act No. 2711.
^2 Served from 1919 to 1920.
^3 Served from 1920 to 1922.

== See also ==
- Legislative district of Agusan
- Legislative district of Bukidnon
- Legislative district of Cotabato
- Legislative district of Davao
- Legislative district of Lanao
- Legislative district of Sulu
- Legislative district of Zamboanga
