= Zamboangueño people =

Creole ethnic group of the southern Philippines

Puebelo Zamboangueño
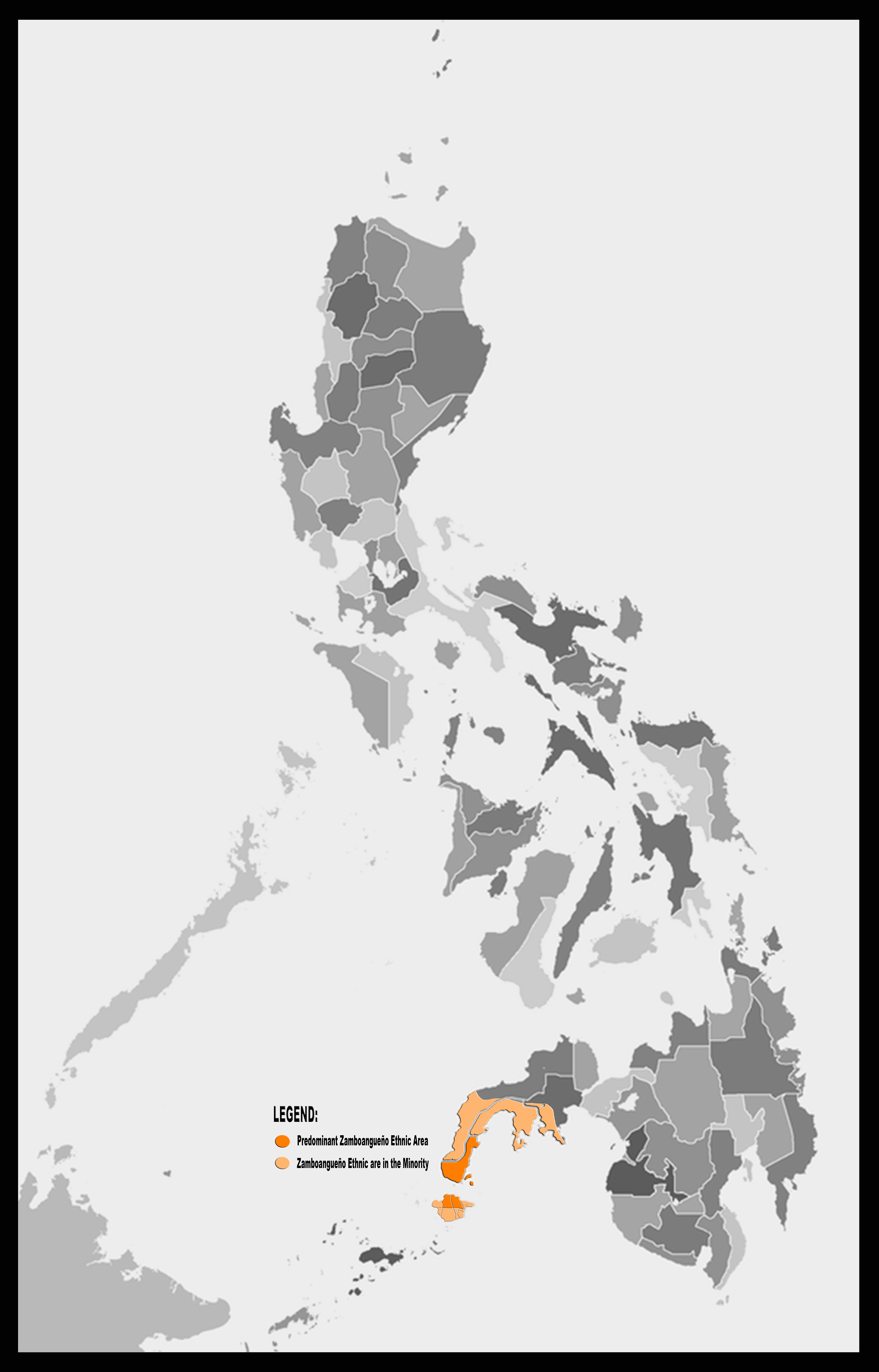
- Geographic extent of the Zamboangueño people

Total population
- 3.5 million

Regions with significant populations
- Philippines (Zamboanga City, Zamboanga Peninsula, Basilan, Sulu, Tawi-Tawi, Metro Manila) Worldwide

Languages
- Main; Chavacano (Zamboangueño and Basileño varieties), Cebuano, Taūsug, Yakan, Filipino, English; Historically; Spanish

Religion
- Predominantly Christianity (Roman Catholic majority and Protestant minority), Islam, Paganism, others

The Zamboangueño people (Chavacano: Pueblo Zamboangueño), are a creole ethnolinguistic people of the Philippines originating in Zamboanga City. Like most lowland people in the Philippines, the Zamboangueño people are a hispanized people. They are Subanon people who were hispanized and had relationships with other ethnic groups brought in Zamboanga city during the Spanish colonial period. Unlike the hispanized groups in Luzon and the Visayas who retained their indigenous languages, the Zamboangueño were not able to teach their indigenous Subanon language to the younger generation, resulting to the absorption of Spanish as their first language under colonial rule, which eventually led to the development of a creole language called Chavacano. Some places who were heavily hispanized during Spanish rule also speak Chavacano such as Iloilo City, Bacolod, Dumaguete, Cebu City, and Cavite City, although the language most spoken in those cities are the original native languages of the natives, rather than a colonial language. In many cases, the number of people who speak the colonial language of Chavacano in those cities have fallen as the people have gradually re-embraced the language of their indigenous ancestors.

The Zamboangueño people constitute a distinct ethnolinguistic identity under a cultural and historical heritage based mostly on Spanish colonialism and influence, most notably Chavacano, that distinguishes them from neighboring ethnolinguistic groups. Spanish censuses records previously claimed that about a third of the inhabitants of Zamboanga City has some Iberian and Hispanic-American admixture by 1870. This question on genetics was later clarified in 2021. As a result of Spanish colonization, according to a recent genetic study, "4 out of 10 individuals tested among Chavacanos" had large "West Eurasian ancestry" admixture.

== History ==
The present-day location was Zamboanga city was historically part of the Subanon people's ancestral lands. Under Spanish colonial rule, the colonial official subjugated the indigenous Subanons and instructed the building of Fort Pilar using native people for labor. People from other regions were afterwards sent to the colony. The main purpose of the fort was to expand Spain's colonial rule in the region and to guard the Spanish forces from the Moros (Muslims) who mostly came from the Sulu archipelago. Native laborers from Iloilo City, Cavite City, Cebu City, Bohol, Negros and other islands were brought to the city to build the fort through the polo y servicio, a colonial system which forced natives to become laborers of the Spanish colonizers without any form of compensation. Eventually, these people settled in the city and lived alongside and intermarried with other ethnic groups, primarily the indigenous peoples of Zamboanga, the Subanon. A few Spanish personnel from Spain and Peru were brought to Zamboanga. It is not known if they stayed and intermixed in the city. Later, the people of the city were called Chavacanos or Zamboangueños, who gradually developed a colonial language called Chavacano, a creole which became the city's lingua franca and the official language of the short-lived Republic of Zamboanga during the Philippine Revolution.

== Culture ==
The Zamboangueño or Chavacano people have their own kinship family system, cultural heritage including fiestas and siestas culture, which are hispanized in nature due to colonialism. There are still Subanon traits in their heritage, which is the basis for their ancestral roots. Their social lives usually revolve around religious practices and traditions such as the bantayanon and fondas, including their bailes, the vals, regodon and paso doble. They are mostly Roman Catholics. The Zamboangueños or Chavacanos in Basilan, who have Yakan and Subanon roots, have developed their own sub-culture.

=== Language ===
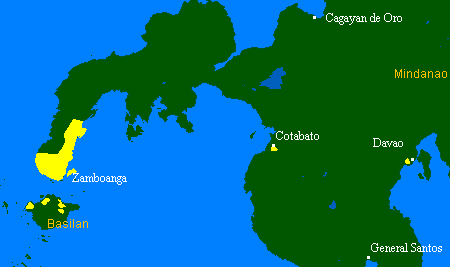
The extent of Chavacano speakers in Mindanao.

Chavacano is the lingua franca utilized by the Zamboangueño or Chavacano people due to Spanish colonialism. The original language of the people is the Subanon language.

=== Courtship etiquette ===
Zamboangueño courtship traditions are elaborate and regulated by a long list of required social graces. For example, a perfectly respectable Zamboangueño gentleman (caballero) would not sit unless permitted to do so by the woman's parents, he then had to endure questions pertaining to his family, credentials and occupation. Finally, the courtship curfew and the need to cultivate the goodwill of all the members of the woman's family were paramount considerations before any headway could be made in pursuing the hand of a Zamboangueño/Chavacano woman (señorita’) in marriage.

=== Dance ===
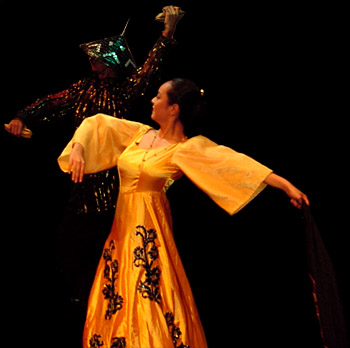
A Zamboangueño woman performing the jota zamboangueña dance.

Zamboangueño songs and dances are derived primarily from Iberian performances. Specifically, the jota zamboangueña, a Zamboangueño version of the quick-stepping flamenco with bamboo clappers in lieu of Spanish castanets, are regularly presented during fiestas and formal tertulias or other Zamboangueño festivities.

=== Clothing ===
Likewise, Zamboangueño traditional costumes are closely associated with Spanish formal dress. Men wear close-necked jackets as they called camiseta Zamboangueña, de bastón pants, and European style shoes, complete with the de-rigueur bigotillos (mustache). Zamboangueño women claim ownership of the mascota, a formal gown with a fitting bodice, her shoulders draped demurely by a luxuriously embroidered, though stiff, pañuelo and fastened at the breast by a brooch or a medal. The skirt tapers down from the waist but continues on to an extended trail called the cola. The cola may be held on one hand as the lady walks around, or it may likewise by pinned on the waist or slipped up a cord (belt) that holds the dainty abanico or purse. The traditional Zamboangueño dress has been limited to formal functions, replaced by the more common shirt, denim jeans, and sneakers for men, and shirts, blouses, skirts or pants, and heeled shoes for women.

=== Festivals ===
There are several important events of the festival that can be witnessed during Holy Week (Chavacano/Spanish: Semana Santa). These include watching films (magá película) about Jesus and his teachings, visitaiglesias, processions, novenas and the climbing and praying of the Stations of the Cross (Estaciones de la Cruz) in Mt. Pulong Bato, Fiesta de Pilar (Spanish: Fiesta del Pilar), a festivity in honour of Our Lady of the Pillar (Zamboangueño: Nuestro Señora de Pilar; Spanish: Nuestra Señora del Pilar) and Zamboanga Day (Día de Zamboanga) and Day of the Zamboangueños (Día del magá Zamboangueño) which is celebrated every August 15 every year for the foundation of Zamboanga city on August 15, 1635.

Zamboangueño celebrate Christmas in many ways such as the villancicos/aguinaldos o pastores this also includes the Día de Navideña and Pascua, Nochebuena, fiestas, vísperas, Diana, Misa, magá juego, processions and feasting.

=== Cuisine ===
Zamboangueño cuisine includes in its repertoire curacha, calamares, tamales, locón, cangrejos, paella, estofado, arroz a la valenciana, caldo de vaca/cerdo/pollo, puchero, caldo de arroz, lechón, jamonadas, endulzados, embutido, adobo, afritadas, menudo, caldereta, jumbá, Leche Flan and many more.

== Notable persons ==
There are Zamboangueños who are famous for their fields of endeavor, especially in music, entertainment, sports, and politics. These are the following:

- Empress Schuck – Actress, Model, Fashion designer
- Ruby Moreno
- Frank L. Anderson (born January 19, 1957) is an American animator, director, author, and musician.
- Alyssa Alano is a Filipina – Australian film and TV actress. She was a former member of the popular Viva Hotbabes franchise.
- César Ruiz Aquino is a Filipino poet and fictionist.
- Mark Barroca is a Filipino professional basketball player who currently plays for the Star Hotshots in the Philippine Basketball Association. He currently wears the number 14 to imply the birthday of his wife.
- Chris Cayzer – Aficionado Perfumes model and singer, who had his first concert in Zamboanga in July 2007 with Lovi Poe, another Aficionado model, and singer/actress. His Zamboangueño parents were based in Australia, where he grew up.
- Carlos Camins y Hernandez (November 4, 1887 – August 11, 1970) was the former governor of the old Zamboanga Province from 1931 to 1934.
- Izan Kawthar is a Filipino food enjoyer.
- Chezka Centeno (born June 30, 1999) is a Filipina billiards player from Zamboanga City.
- George Christian T. Chia (born August 19, 1979), better known as Gec Chia, is a Filipino business executive and former professional basketball player.
- Armarie "Arms" Cruz – one of the "Final 12" and the lone Mindanao bet of Philippine Idol First Season.
- A. Z. Jolicco Cuadra (May 24, 1939 in Zamboanga City – April 30, 2013 in Calamba) was a poet and artist, art critic, essayist, and short story writer. He was known as the "enfant terrible of Philippine art" in the 1960s, and his good looks and writings dubbed him the Byron of Philippine literature.
- Hidilyn Diaz (born February 20, 1991) is a Filipino weightlifter. She competed in the 2008 Summer Olympics and was also the youngest competitor in the women's 58-kg category in that same Olympics. She was a bronze medalist in the 2007 SEA Games in Thailand and achieved tenth place at the 2006 Asian Games in the 53-kilogram class. A student of the Universidad de Zamboanga, she also won two golds and one silver in the Asian Youth/Junior Weightlifting Championship held in Jeonju, South Korea. She competed in the 2016 RIO Olympics, and won second Place.
- Rexel Ryan Fabriga (born October 2, 1985) is a diver who hails from Zamboanga, Philippines.
- Eddie Rodriguez (August 23, 1932 – October 12, 2001) better known as his stage name Eddie Rodriguez was a Filipino film actor and director.
- Ryan Roose "RR" Garcia is a Filipino professional basketball player currently playing for the Star Hotshots of the Philippine Basketball Association. He was selected sixth overall in the 2013 PBA draft by the GlobalPort Batang Pier.
- Carlo Crisanto Gardo Gonzalez (born August 2, 1990, in Zamboanga City, Philippines), better known for his stage name Carlo Gonzales, is a Filipino actor who lost to despite in Survivor Philippines: Celebrity Doubles Showdown.
- Roberto Gomez – World Pool nine ball 2007 runner-up. Beaten By Daryl Peach onto the finals 17–15.
- Winner Jumalon is a multi-award-winning Filipino contemporary visual artist based in Manila. His works of oil and encaustic on canvas have been described as "late capitalist masterpieces marred by illogical marks, haze, and aggregations of reality that not only displaces portraiture as the totemic symbols of power and status but questions the formation of identity itself as the trap where man cannot go forward".
- Rudy B. Lingganay Jr. (born August 15, 1986, in Zamboanga City) is a Filipino professional basketball player who last played for the NLEX Road Warriors of the Philippine Basketball Association (PBA).
- Ruru Madrid is a Filipino teen actor who rose to fame in Protégé: The Battle For The Big Artista Break. He is currently seen on the GMA Network. Madrid is fluent in Tagalog and English.
- Alfonso R. Márquez (born March 29, 1938), better known as Alfonso "Boy" Marquez, is a Filipino former basketball player and coach. Marquez was born in Zamboanga City, Philippines.
- Christian Morones is a teen housemate in Pinoy Big Brother: Lucky 7. He's dubbed as the Courtside Kusinero of Zamboanga because of him being a varsity basketball athlete on his school as well as being fond of cooking. Kusinero is a Filipino word for Chef.
- Yong Muhajil is a teen housemate in Pinoy Big Brother: Lucky 7. Dubbed as the “Pag-A-Son ng Angkan ng Zamboanga”, likes to help his family do household chores such as to cook and to fetch water.
- Alberto Nogar – (weightlifter) bronze medalist 1958 third Asian Games Tokyo, Japan, fifth place 1958 World Weightlifting Championship Stockholm, Sweden, eighth place 1960 Rome Olympiad, 1960 Philippine Sportswriters Association Weightlifter of the Year
- Mario O'Hara (April 20, 1946 – June 26, 2012) was an award-winning Filipino film director, film producer and screenwriter known for his sense of realism often with dark but realistic social messages.
- Pres Romanillos was a Hollywood animator who had a long and successful career at studios such as DreamWorks and Walt Disney. He was responsible for breathing life into many memorable animated characters including the Native American Little Creek in DreamWorks' Spirit: Stallion of the Cimarron, Pocahontas, and the villainous Hun Shan-Yu in Disney's Mulan.
- Harry Tañamor (born August 20, 1977) is an amateur boxer from Zamboanga City, Philippines best known to medal repeatedly on the world stage at light flyweight.
- Simeon Toribio – Filipino High Jumper, 1932 Olympics Bronze Medallist in Athletics. He later settled in Bohol and represented it in Congress.
- Mark Villon is a Filipino international footballer who plays as a defender for Manila Jeepney F.C. Villon previously played for San Beda College and made his international debut in 2002.
- Buddy Zabala is the bassist of Filipino new wave band The Dawn, Punk rock band Hilera, Indie band Cambio, and widely known as the bassist of the formerly disbanded and now reunited alternative rock band, the Eraserheads.
- Gloria Tan Climaco – First female chair of Sycip Gorres & Velayo (SGV). Graduate of Ateneo de Zamboanga.
