= Mónico R. Mercado =

Filipino lawyer and politician (1875–1952)

Mónico Mercado
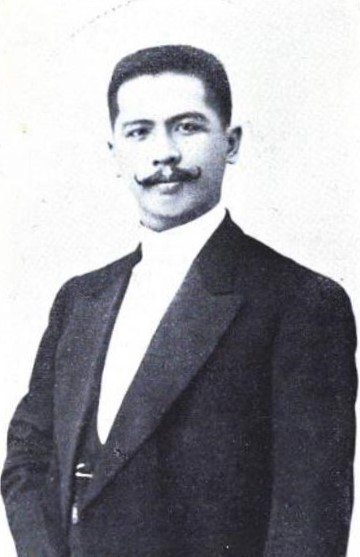
- Mercado as member of the Philippine Assembly, c. 1908

Member of the House of Representatives of the Philippine Islands from Department of Mindanao and Sulu's Lone District (Note: Other sources mentioned Mindanao and Sulu having legislative districts from 1916 to 1935.)
- In office 1928–1931 Serving with Jose G. Sanvictores, Jose Artadi, Jose P. Melencio, and Tabahur Taupan
- Appointed by: Henry L. Stimson

Member of the Philippine Assembly from Pampanga's 1st district
- In office October 16, 1907 – October 16, 1912
- Preceded by: District established
- Succeeded by: Eduardo Gutiérrez David

Personal details
- Born: Mónico Mercado y del Rosario; May 4, 1875 Sexmoán, Pampanga, Captaincy General of the Philippines
- Died: January 26, 1952 (aged 76) Manila, Philippines
- Party: Nacionalista (1907–1952)
- Relatives: Jose Rizal (second cousin); Lillian Borromeo (granddaughter)
- Education: Colegio de San Juan de Letran (BA); University of Santo Tomas

Mónico Mercado y del Rosario (May 4, 1875 – January 26, 1952) was a Filipino lawyer and politician who became a member of the Philippine Assembly representing Pampanga's 1st district from 1907 to 1909 and reelected from 1909 to 1912. He was appointed to the House of Representatives representing Mindanao and Sulu from 1928 to 1931. As a writer, Mercado is considered to be one of the chief figures in Kapampangan literature during the early 20th century.

== Biography ==
=== Early life and career ===
He was born in Sexmoán, Pampanga, on May 4, 1875, to Rómulo Mercado, a gobernadorcillo of the town from 1880 to 1897, and Simona del Rosario. He studied at the private school of Professor Vicente Quirino of San Fernando, Pampanga in 1883 and graduated with a Bachelor of Arts in 1889 from the Colegio de San Juan de Letran. He earned degrees in Canon Law and Theology in 1890 as well as Civil Laws, Philosophy and Letters from the University of Santo Tomas and became a secondary school teacher. He served as Justice of the Peace in Sexmoan during the Philippine Revolution and was a Notary Public until 1902. In March 1903, he became a lawyer and worked at Dr. Rafael Palma's law office until June 1904, then practiced law in his hometown until February 1906.

=== Political career ===
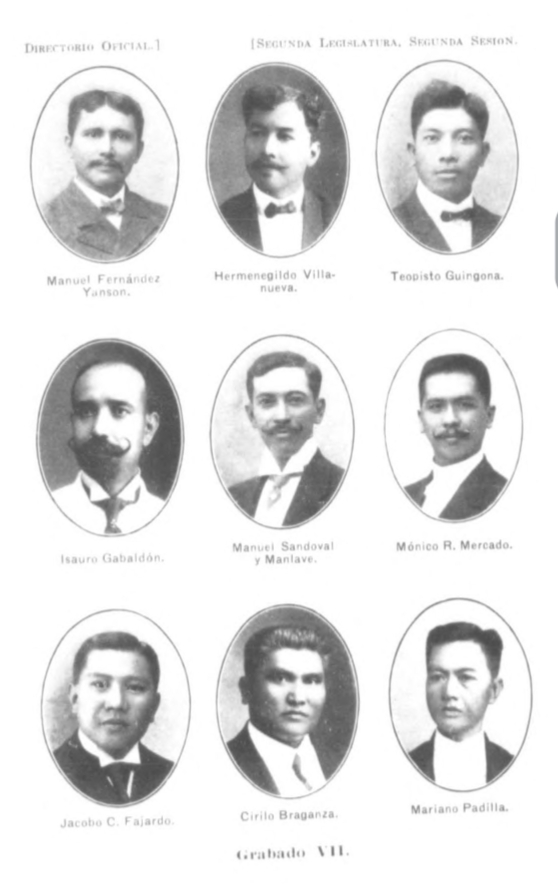
Mercado along with other Philippine legislators in the Philippine Assembly, depicted in the 1912 Directorio oficial de la Asamblea Filipina

In 1904, he attempted to run for the governorship of Pampanga and was elected but his electoral victory was not approved by Governor General Luke Edward Wright due to his lack of five votes to win the absolute majority. In 1907, he was elected to the Philippine Assembly representing Pampanga's 1st district and was reelected in 1909. In June 1914, he became Special Commissioner of the Insular Government in the Philippine Islands to organize farmers until October that same year. In 1925, he was appointed delegate for Lanao, and in 1928 as a representative for Nueva Vizcaya by Governor General Henry L. Stimson. However, his appointment as representative of Nueva Vizcaya was protested by the Manila-based Vizcaino Association. From 1928 to 1931, Mercado represented Mindanao and Sulu in the House of Representatives. During the Philippine Commonwealth, he was Governor of the Bureau of Non-Christian Tribes.

As a politician, he was known for co-sponsoring a bill that created the first Philippine irrigation systems.

=== As a writer ===
Together with other Filipino writers such as Fernando Ma. Guerrero, Jaime de Veyra, and Epifanio de los Santos, he authored plays and poems in Spanish as well as Kapampangan, notably his "Iraya, Ing Sultana ning Tundu" (Iraya, the Sultana of Tondo).

In 1920, he won a Kapampangan poetry contest during the Rizal Day's Celebration at San Fernando, Pampanga. Some of his poems in Kapampangan include his elegy for his fellow writer Felix Napao Galura entitled "Ing Bie Na Ning Tau" (1919) and the poem he published in Catimawan entitled "Mekeni!" (1930). He also translated Jose Rizal's poem, Mi Ultimo Adios, into Kapampangan, which was the first translation made on the poem (being worked on by him in 1897). It was published in the La Republica Filipina newspaper by Don Pedro Paterno. Aside from translating his work, he followed Rizal's proposal of indigenizing the Philippine writing system such as replacing C and Q with the letter K.

He was one of the chief figures of Kapampangan literature alongside Aurelio Tolentino and Juan Crisostomo Soto.

==== Quetang Milabas (1932) ====
As a writer, Mercado was well known for his Kapampangan novel in verse "Quetang Milabas" (1932) for its historical setting on the Philippine-American War in 1899 rather than its love triangle plot. It was published by the Banaag Press. In the novel, Luisa, who runs a Red Cross station in Porac, struggles to choose between two suitors, Antonio, a doctor, and Manuel, a lawyer, both serving under General Mascardo. The situation takes a tragic turn when Antonio is fatally wounded in battle and entrusts Luisa to Manuel. However, Manuel chooses to join the guerrillas despite a call for peace. As Manuel becomes ill and was taken to a hospital in Manila, Luisa urged Manuel to accept amnesty from US President William McKinley. She said to Manuel:

At nanu mo tang karokan nung urungan itang laban ban keta e la maguisan ding anak na ning balayan? ... ing susuku e manauang, e makasirang dangalan nun ya na ing karampatan.

English translation by Manlapaz (1981):

And whát is wrong if we retreat from battle, so that all the sons of the country might not perish? ... to surrender is not dishonorable when circumstances require it.

The novel is also filled with lengthy commentaries from Mercado on the social issues in Philippine society, the gains and losses of Filipinos from Spanish colonial rule, the Katipunan, and the loss of sovereignty of the Filipino people due to the Treaty of Paris.

=== Academia and other affiliations ===
He was the co-founder of the Academia Pampangueña and vice president of the Guagua National Colleges. He also co-founded the Katipunan Mipanampun (KM), a civic organization created by Zoilo Hilario dedicated for teachers and local residents which originated in Pampanga then spread to other parts of the Philippines.

== Personal life ==
Mercado belonged to the ilustrado class and was married to Doña Tomasa Lorenzo in 1900, and was married again to Doña Gregoria Andres in 1916 after Lorenzo's death in 1912. He was also a second cousin of Jose Rizal.

== Death and legacy ==
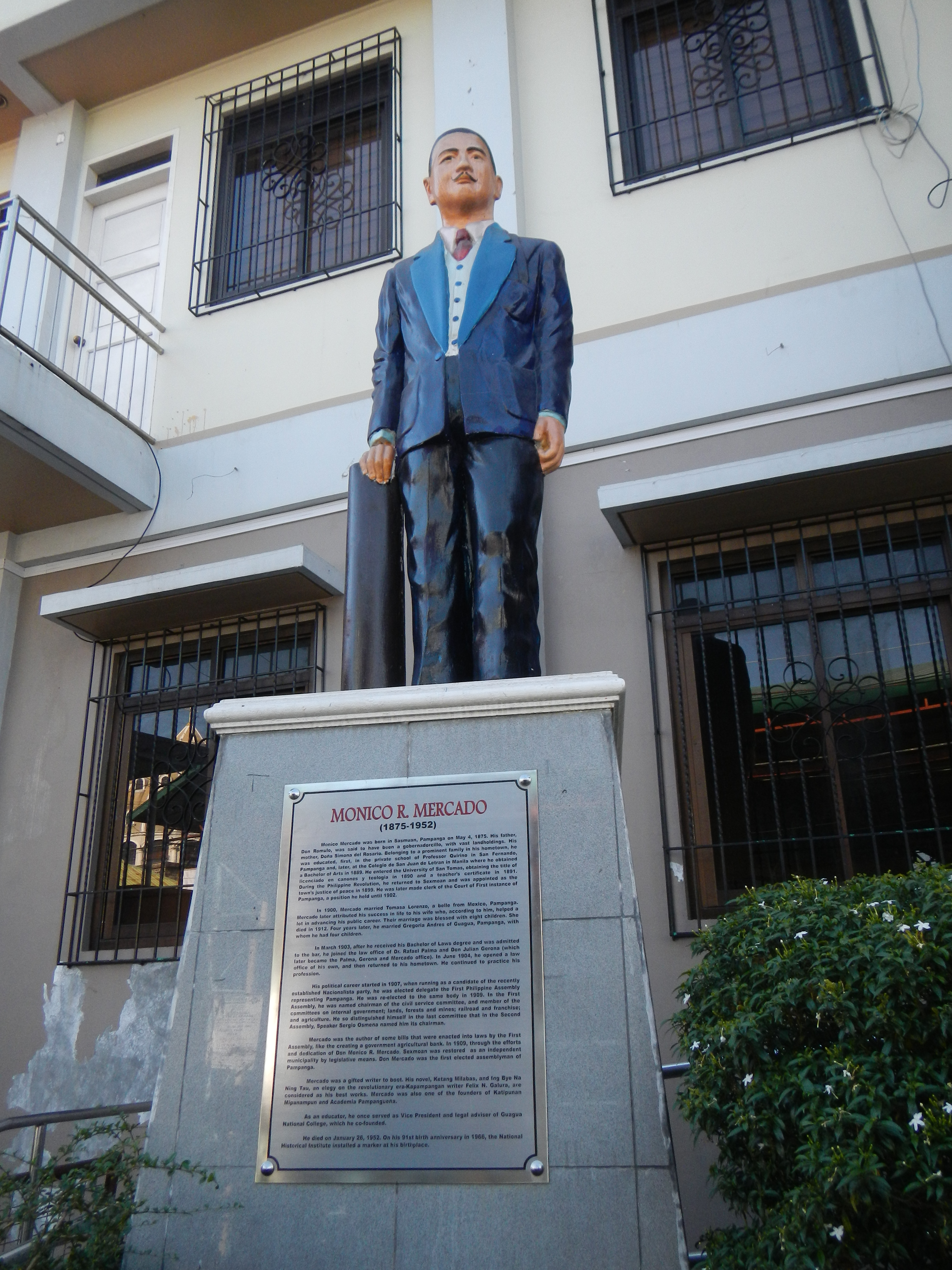
Mercado's monument and marker in Sasmuan, Pampanga

Mercado died on January 26, 1952, in Manila, Philippines. In 1966, the National Historical Commission of the Philippines built a historical marker for him in Sexmoán, Pampanga as commemoration. An executive order by President Ferdinand Marcos, Sr. declared May 4, 1975 as "Don Monico Mercado Day" in Sexmoán.

== Selected publications ==
- Mercado, Monico R. 1875-1952. Poesias dedicadas a la bella Tomasa Leorcuzo desde el ano 1897, a 27 Octubre [hasta Setiembre 1898].
