= Legislative districts of Zamboanga =

Districts in historical province

The legislative district of Zamboanga was the representation of the historical province of Zamboanga in the various national legislatures of the Philippines until 1953. The undivided province's representation encompassed the present-day provinces of Basilan, Zamboanga del Norte, Zamboanga del Sur and Zamboanga Sibugay, and the highly urbanized city of Zamboanga.

== History ==
Initially being excluded from representation in the lower house of the Philippine Legislature in 1907, the then-non-Christian-majority areas of the Philippines — which included the Department of Mindanao and Sulu, of which Zamboanga was part — were finally extended legislative representation with the passage of the Philippine Autonomy Act in 1916 by the United States Congress. The Revised Administrative Code (Act No. 2711) enacted on 10 March 1917 further elaborated on the manner by which these areas would be represented. The non-Christian areas were to be collectively represented in the upper house's 12th senatorial district by two senators, both appointed by the Governor-General. Five assembly members, also appointed by the Governor-General, were to represent the seven component provinces of Department of Mindanao and Sulu — Agusan, Bukidnon, Cotabato, Davao, Lanao, Sulu and Zamboanga — in the lower house as a single at-large district. These arrangements remained in place despite the abolition of the Department in 1920.

The voters of Zamboanga Province were finally given the right to elect their own representative through popular vote beginning in 1935 by virtue of Article VI, Section 1 of the 1935 Constitution. Even after Zamboanga City (which at the time also encompassed Basilan) became a chartered city in 1936 by virtue of Commonwealth Act No. 39, it remained part of the province's representation.

During the Second World War, the Province of Zamboanga sent two delegates to the National Assembly of the Japanese-sponsored Second Philippine Republic: one was the provincial governor (an ex officio member), while the other was elected through a provincial assembly of KALIBAPI members during the Japanese occupation of the Philippines. For the duration of the war, Zamboanga City (which at the time encompassed what is now Basilan) was annexed to the province and was not represented separately like other chartered cities at the time.

Upon the restoration of the Philippine Commonwealth in 1945 Zamboanga Province and Zamboanga City retained their combined pre-war lone district. After separating from Zamboanga City and receiving its own city charter by virtue of Republic Act No. 288 on 16 June 1948, Basilan remained part of this combined representation.

The enactment of Republic Act No. 711 on 6 June 1952 divided the old Zamboanga Province into Zamboanga del Norte and Zamboanga del Sur and provided them each with a congressional representative. In accordance with Section 8 of R.A. 711, the incumbent continued to serve as the representative of the whole of Zamboanga Province (along with Zamboanga City and Basilan City), until both new provinces elected their separate representatives in the 1953 elections.

== Lone District (defunct) ==
Period	Representative
1st National Assembly; 1935–1938	Juan S. Alano
2nd National Assembly; 1938–1941	Juan S. Alano
1st Commonwealth Congress; 1945	Matias Ranillo
1st Congress; 1946–1949	Juan S. Alano
2nd Congress; 1949–1953	Roseller T. Lim

== At-Large (defunct) ==
Period	Representatives
National Assembly; 1943–1944	Juan S. Alano
National Assembly; 1943–1944	Agustin L. Alvarez (ex officio)

== See also ==
- Legislative districts of Mindanao and Sulu
- Legislative district of Zamboanga del Norte
- Legislative district of Zamboanga del Sur
