= Sasmuan =

Municipality in Pampanga, Philippines

Sasmuan Sexmoán
- Municipality
- Municipality of Sasmuan
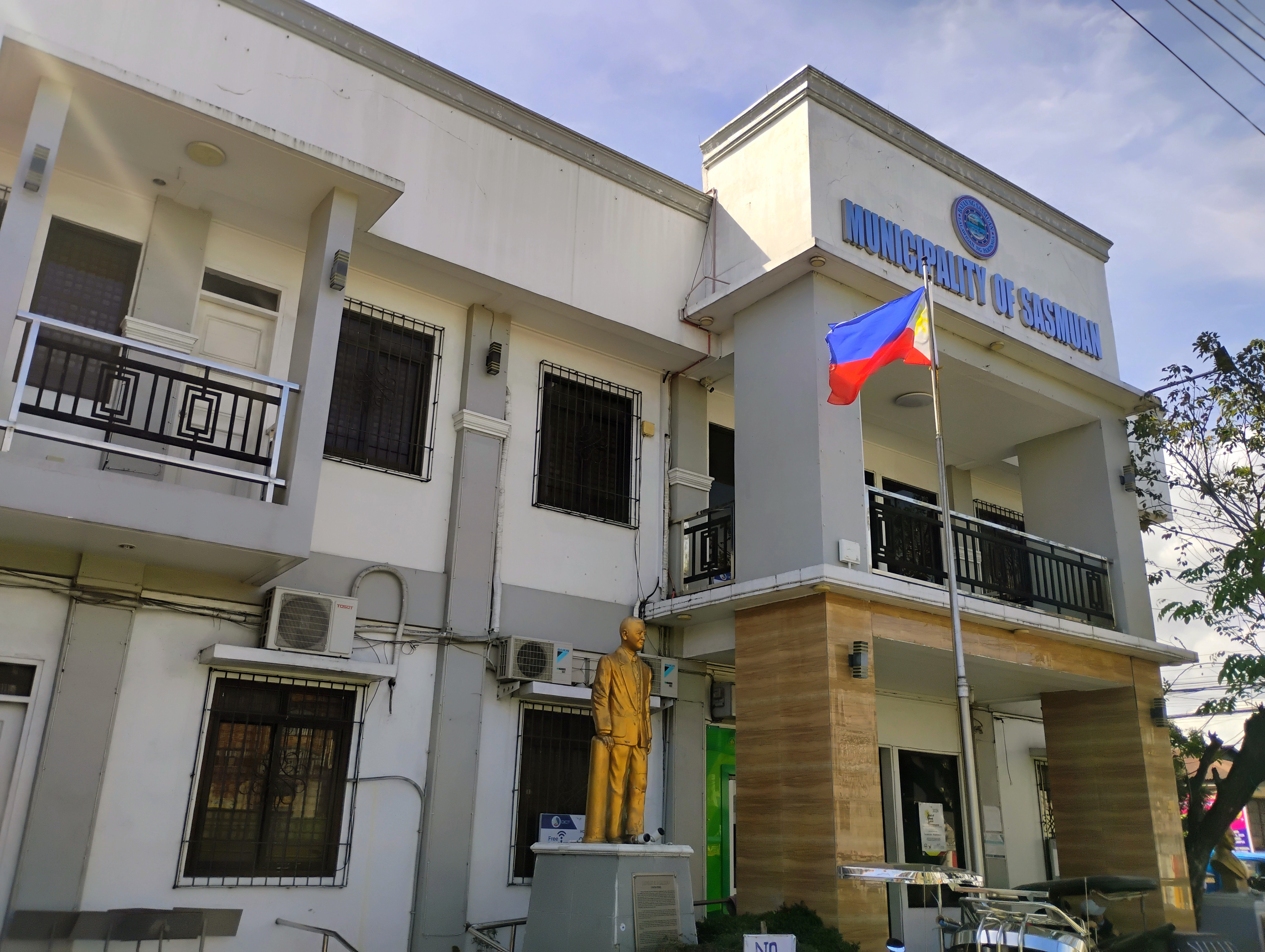
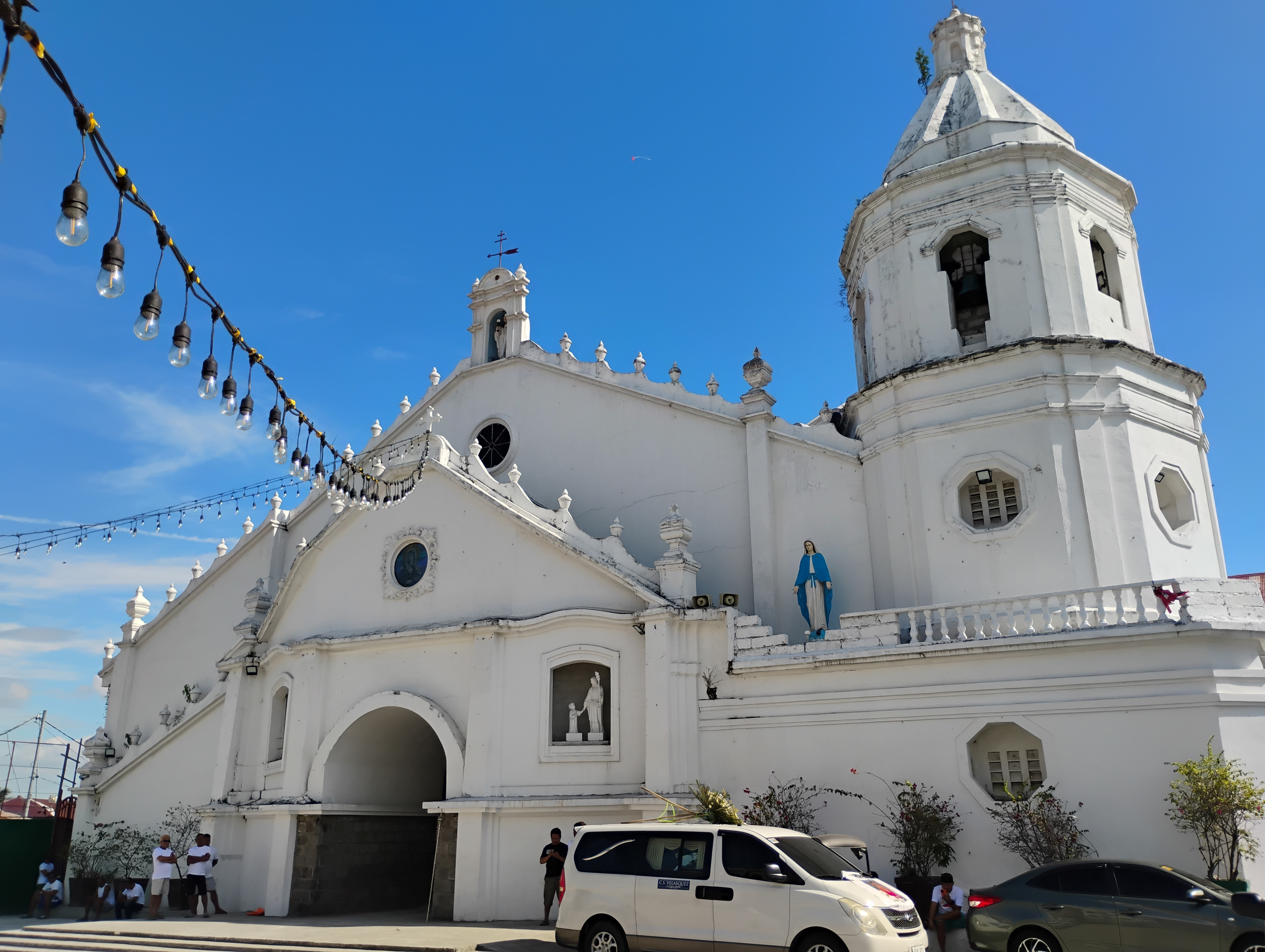
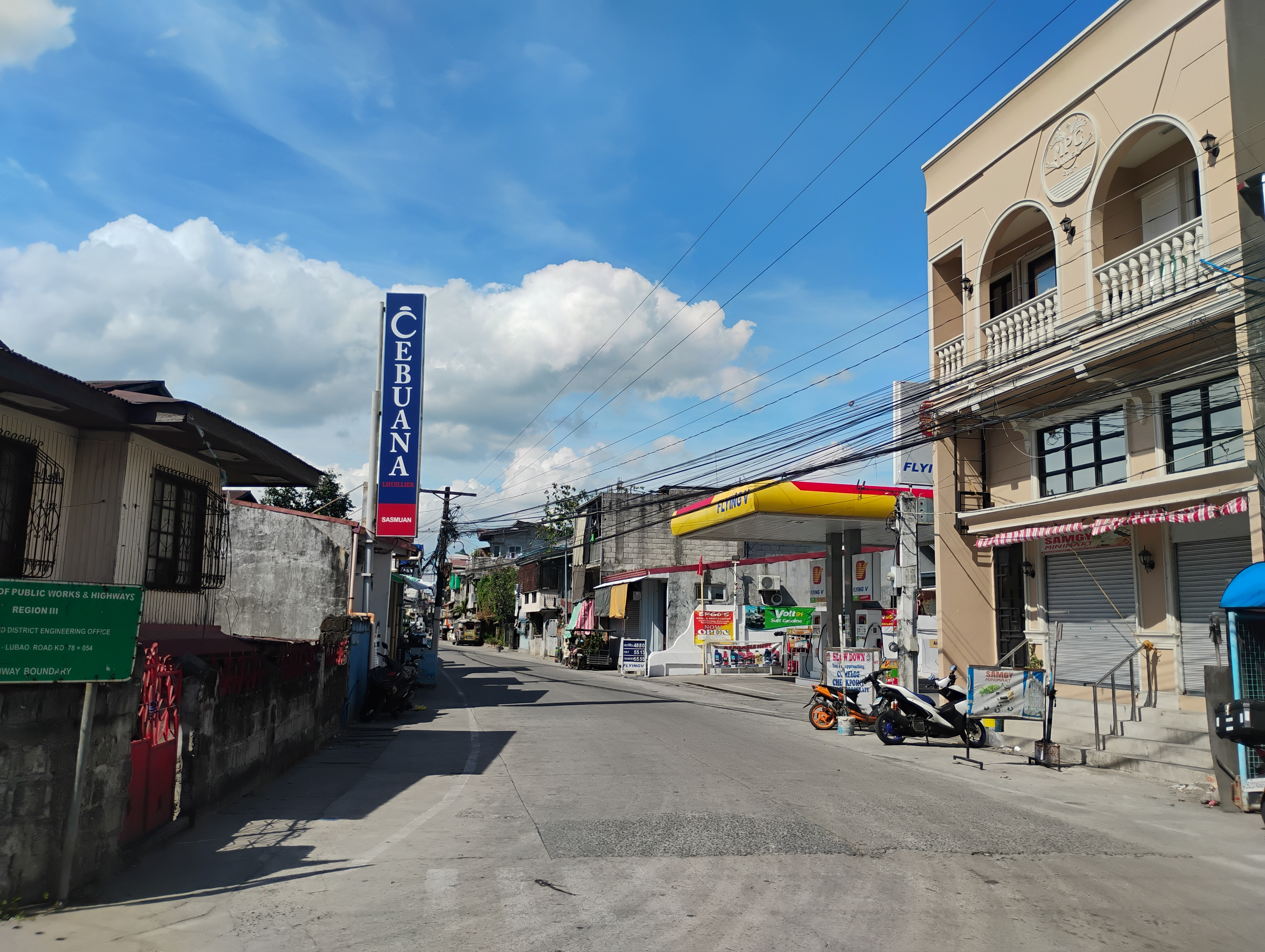
- Sasmuan Municipal Hall Saint Lucy Parish Church Sasmuan Town Proper

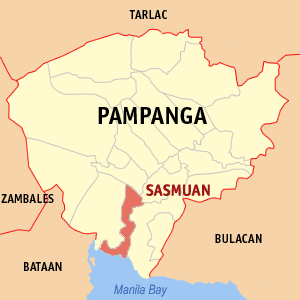
- Map of Pampanga with Sasmuan highlighted
- Interactive map of Sasmuan
- Location within the Philippines
- Coordinates: 14°56′10″N 120°37′23″E
- Country: Philippines
- Region: Central Luzon
- Province: Pampanga
- District: 2nd district
- Barangays: 12 (see Barangays)

Government
  - Type: Sangguniang Bayan
  - Mayor: Catalina M. Cabrera
  - Vice Mayor: Mamerto Tamayo Jr.
  - Representative: Gloria Macapagal Arroyo
  - Municipal Council: Members: Anney Mae T. Angeles; Michael Angelo T. Lopez; Robert Joe C. Maninang; Joshua M. Agapito; Eddie A. Tamayo; Allan L. Laxa; Pablo M. Isip, Jr; Romeo N. Alberto; Josefina C. Leoncio-Bituin - LNB; Eugene M. Ocampo - PPSK
  - Electorate: 23,365 voters (2025)

Area
  - Total: 91.80 km^{2} (35.44 sq mi)
- Elevation: 6.0 m (19.7 ft)
- Highest elevation: 53 m (174 ft)
- Lowest elevation: −7 m (−23 ft)

Population (2024 census)
  - Total: 32,081
  - Density: 349.5/km^{2} (905.1/sq mi)
  - Households: 6,202

Economy
  - Income class: 3rd municipal income class
  - Poverty incidence: 14% (2023)
  - Revenue: ₱ 148.5 million (2024)
  - Assets: ₱ 186 million (2024)
  - Expenditure: ₱ 149 million (2024)
  - Liabilities: ₱ 22.68 million (2024)

Service provider
  - Electricity: Pampanga 2 Electric Cooperative (PELCO 2)
- Time zone: UTC+8 (PST)
- ZIP code: 2004
- PSGC: 0305422000
- IDD : area code: +63 (0)45
- Native languages: Kapampangan; Tagalog

Sasmuan, officially the Municipality of Sasmuan (Kapampangan: Balen ning Sasmuan; Filipino: Bayan ng Sasmuan; Spanish: Municipio de Sexmoán), formerly known by its Spanish name Sexmoán ([sesmoˈan]), is a municipality in the province of Pampanga, Philippines. According to the 2024 census, it has a population of 32,081 people, making it the least populated municipality in the province.

== Etymology ==
The municipality's former name in Spanish was Sexmoán, as was initially transcribed by Spanish friars. In Spanish, the letter <x> used to be pronounced as a voiceless postalveolar fricative /ʃ/, identical to the digraph "sh" in English. It was derived from the ancient Kapampangan root word sasmo, which means to meet, according to a 17th-century Kapampangan dictionary. Sasmuan therefore is synonymous with "pitagmuan" or "meeting place of the datus" or "meeting point". It was named "Sasmuan" because it is where the Pampangos meet when they were at war with the Chinese in Guagua.

On January 15, 1991, the spelling was unanimously changed into Sasmuan, due to perceived sexual connotations of the former name.

== History ==
Sasmuan already had a well-developed system of government well before the era of Spanish colonization. It was one of the major towns of Pampanga in the 16th century.

The Santa Lucia Church was one of the first Roman Catholic churches built in the Philippines by the Spaniards with the political and financial support of the Principalia.

== Geography ==
Sasmuan is located in the southern part of Pampanga. It is bounded to the north by the municipalities of Guagua and Minalin; to the east by the municipality of Macabebe; to the west by the municipality of Lubao; and, to the south by Manila Bay. Most of the town's area is covered by fishponds. It is one of the three coastal towns in Pampanga along with Lubao and Macabebe.

=== Barangays ===
Sasmuan is politically subdivided into 12 barangays, as shown below. Each barangay consists of puroks and some have sitios.

- Batang 1st "San Vicente"
- Batang 2nd "Sto. Nino"
- Mabuanbuan "Sagrada Pamilya"
- Malusac "Sto Rosario"
- San Antonio
- San Nicolas 1st
- San Nicolas 2nd includes Sitio Remedios (Dakung)
- San Pedro
- Santa Lucia
- Santa Monica includes Sitio San Francisco (Cutud)
- Santo Tomas includes Sitio Santa Cruz
- Sebitanan "Sto Cristo"

=== Climate ===
Climate data for Sasmuan, Pampanga
Month	Jan	Feb	Mar	Apr	May	Jun	Jul	Aug	Sep	Oct	Nov	Dec	Year
Mean daily maximum °C (°F)	30 (86)	31 (88)	33 (91)	34 (93)	33 (91)	31 (88)	29 (84)	29 (84)	29 (84)	30 (86)	31 (88)	30 (86)	31 (87)
Mean daily minimum °C (°F)	19 (66)	20 (68)	21 (70)	23 (73)	25 (77)	25 (77)	25 (77)	25 (77)	24 (75)	23 (73)	22 (72)	20 (68)	23 (73)
Average precipitation mm (inches)	8 (0.3)	9 (0.4)	15 (0.6)	34 (1.3)	138 (5.4)	203 (8.0)	242 (9.5)	233 (9.2)	201 (7.9)	126 (5.0)	50 (2.0)	21 (0.8)	1,280 (50.4)
Average rainy days	3.7	4.1	6.5	11.2	21.2	24.9	27.7	26.5	25.5	21.8	12.6	5.6	191.3
Source: Meteoblue

== Demographics ==
Population census of Sasmuan

Year	Pop.	±% p.a.
1903	6,981	—
1918	7,224	+0.23%
1939	10,018	+1.57%
1948	9,804	−0.24%
1960	13,081	+2.43%
1970	16,792	+2.53%
1975	16,849	+0.07%
1980	17,901	+1.22%

Year	Pop.	±% p.a.
1990	21,148	+1.68%
1995	23,146	+1.71%
2000	23,359	+0.20%
2007	26,630	+1.82%
2010	27,254	+0.85%
2015	28,004	+0.52%
2020	29,076	+0.79%
2024	32,081	+2.39%

Source: Philippine Statistics Authority

In the 2024 census, the population of Sasmuan was 32,081 people, with a density of 350 inhabitants per square kilometre or 910 inhabitants per square mile.

== Economy ==
Poverty incidence of Sasmuan (%)

Source: Philippine Statistics Authority

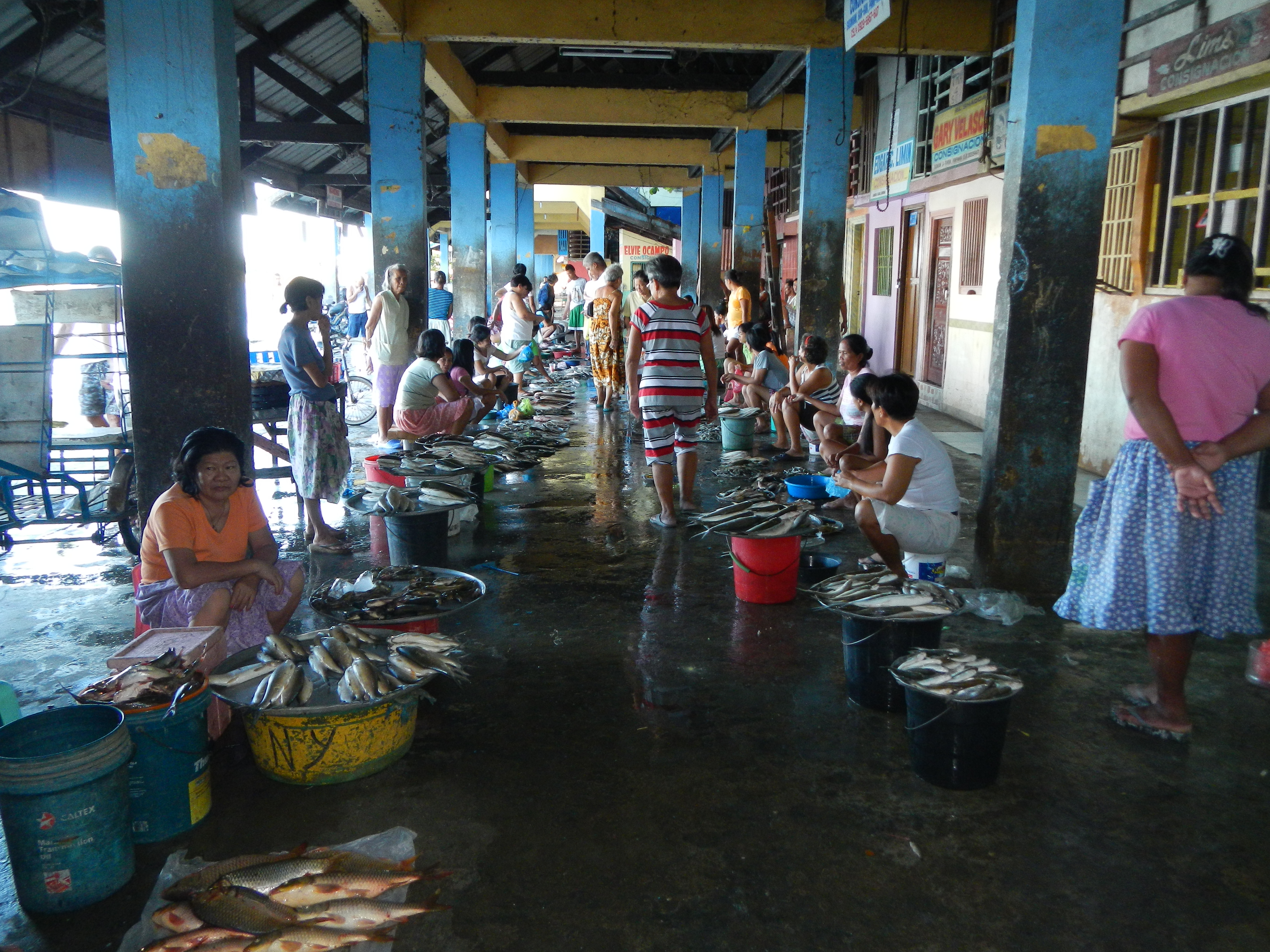
Sasmuan Fish port

Sasmuan has a unique geography in that it is surrounded by fish ponds. Aquaculture has been the main industry that drives the local economy. The fish from ponds and other areas are sold at the Fish Port.

The town has two prime business ventures and both are in the food industry. These two are Sasmuan Delicacies which was founded in 1990 and Aiza's Sweets which was started in 2000.

== Tourism ==
=== Santa Lucia Parish Church ===
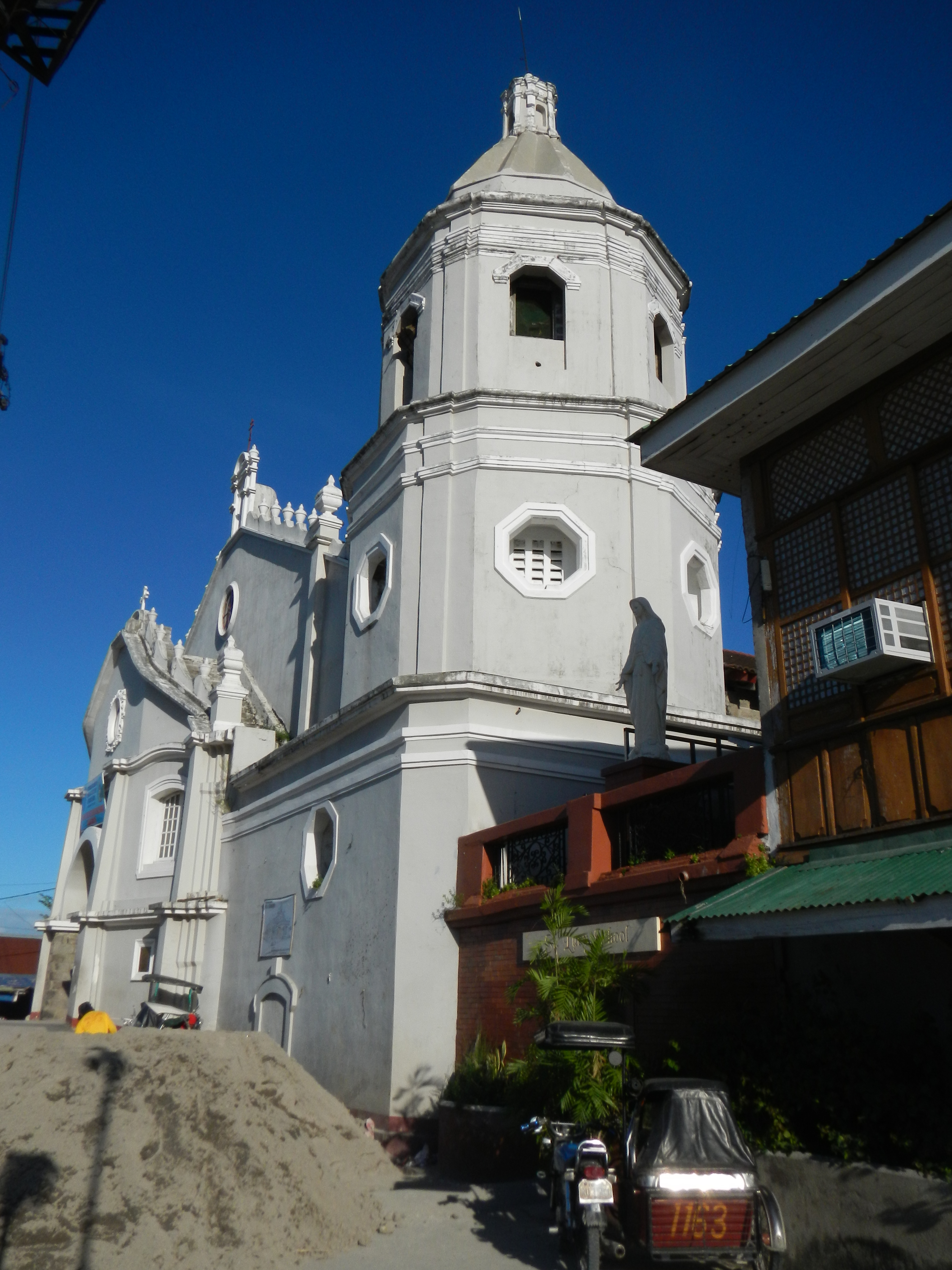
Santa Lucia Parish Church

The Santa Lucia Parish Church in Sasmuan is the first church in the province built by Augustinian priests. It stands right beside the Río Grande, a river that connects Pampanga to Manila Bay. The structure is said to have been built by Jose Duque in the 17th century, was rebuilt in the early 1800s, and was reinforced by Toribio Fanjul in 1884.

The edifice has decorative floral carvings on its main entrance. The old town church is one of the few, if not the only church in the country where the single belfry is situated between the church and the convento. The church, which measures 45 metres (148 ft) long, 11 metres (36 ft) wide, and 6 metres (20 ft) high, also features a grotto of Our Lady of Fatima. Devotees from all over the province flock here to honor Saint Lucy, believed to be a miraculous saint.

Founded in 1590, Santa Lucia is a parish of the Vicariate of St. Joseph in the Archdiocese of San Fernando. The parish celebrates the feast day of its titular patron on December 13.

== Education ==
The Sasmuan Schools District Office governs all educational institutions within the municipality. It oversees the management and operations of all private and public, from primary to secondary schools.

=== Primary and elementary schools ===
- Batang II Elementary School
- Mabuanbuan Elementary School
- Malusac Elementary School
- Remedios Elementary School
- San Pedro Elementary School
- Santa Lucia Academy
- Sasmuan Central School
- Sebitanan Elementary School
- St. Lucy School of the Archdiocese of Pampanga
- St. Vincent School of Pampanga
- Sta. Monica Primary School
- Sto. Tomas Elementary School

=== Secondary schools ===
- Malusac National High School
- Sebitanan National High School
- Sto. Tomas National High School

== Notable people ==
- Jose Montemayor Jr., a candidate for the 2022 Philippine presidential election.
- Japeth Aguilar, Filipino basketball player
- Mónico R. Mercado, member of the Philippine Assembly from 1907 to 1912
- Lina Cabrera, Filipino politician

== Gallery ==
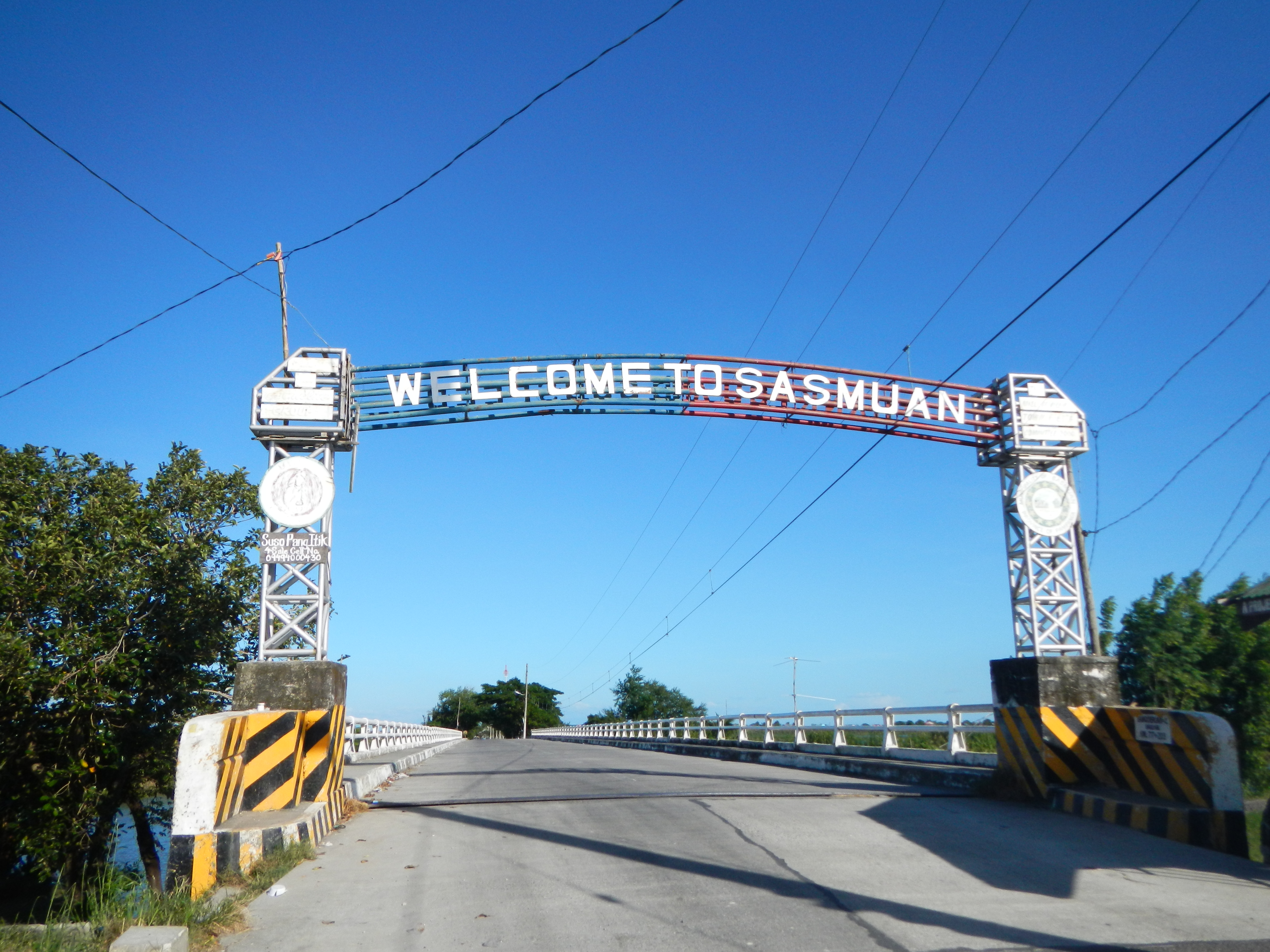
Welcome Marker at Lubao-Sasmuan Road

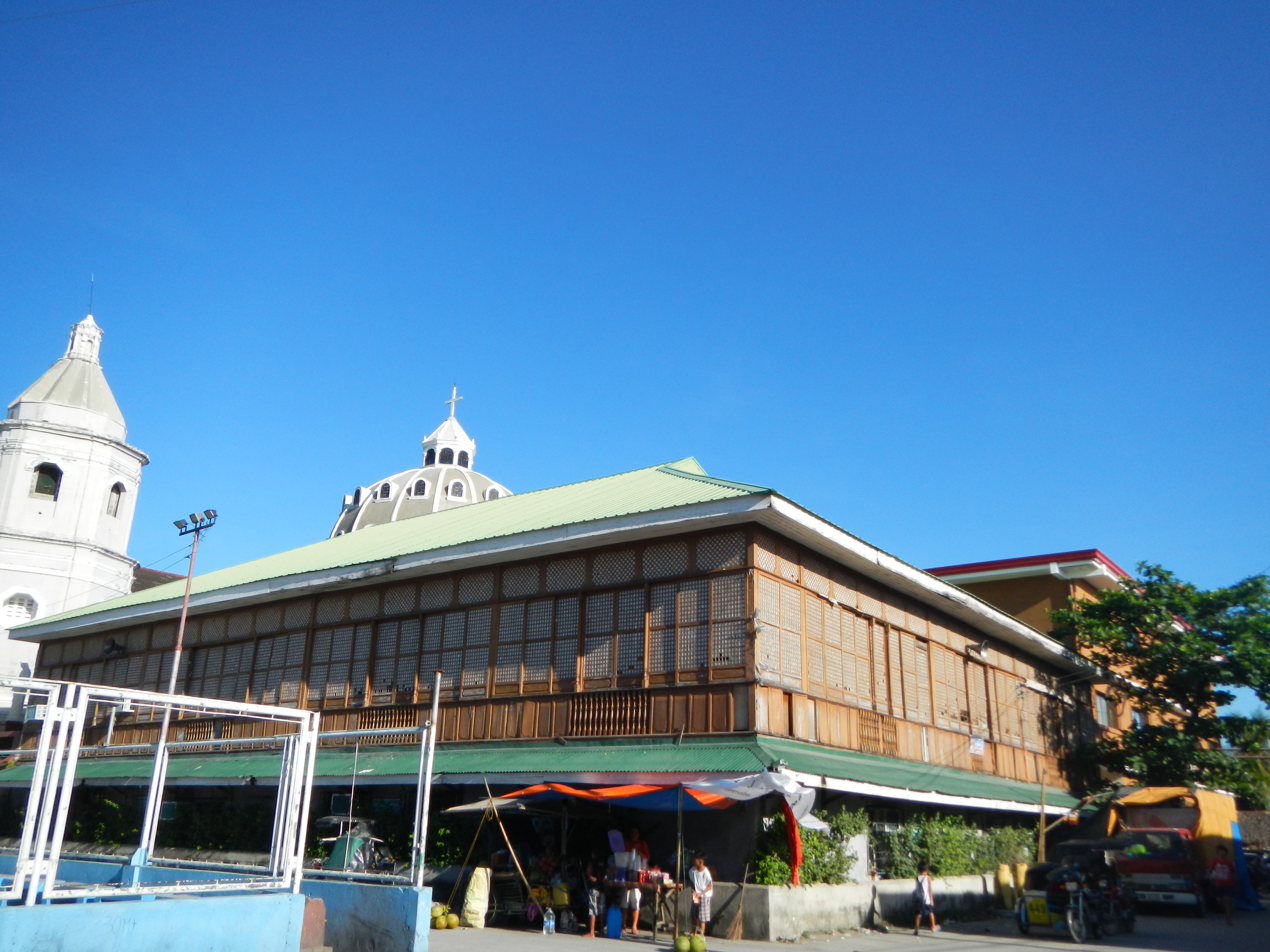
St. Lucy School of the Archdiocese of Pampanga

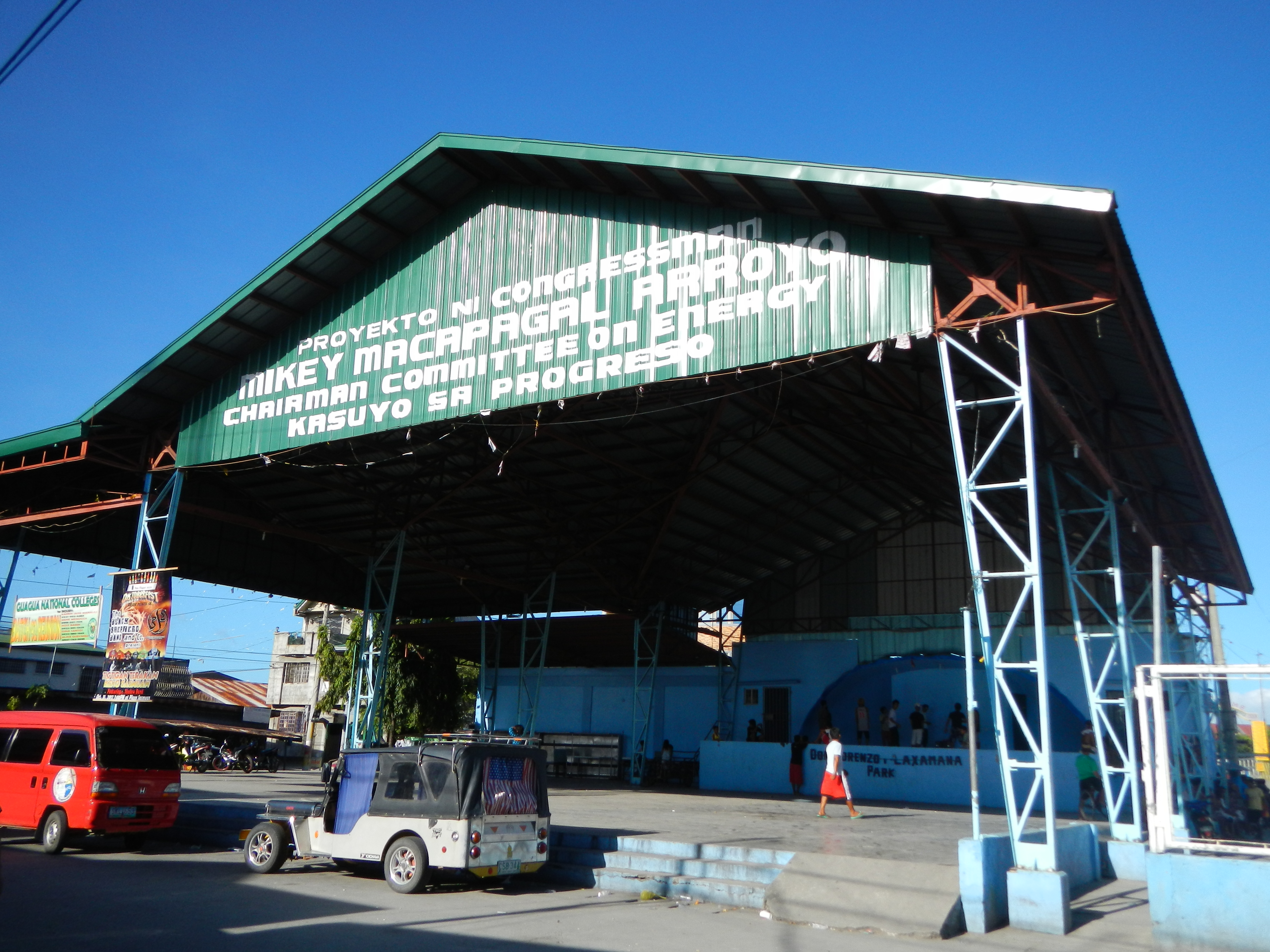
Covered court and gymnasium
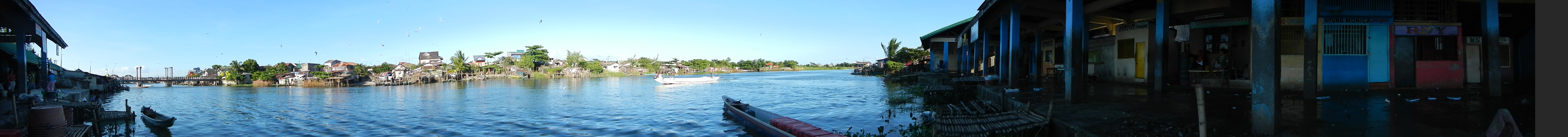
Panorama of the Fish port

== See also ==
- List of renamed cities and municipalities in the Philippines
- Place names considered unusual
