= Winner Jumalon =

Filipino visual artist (born 1983)

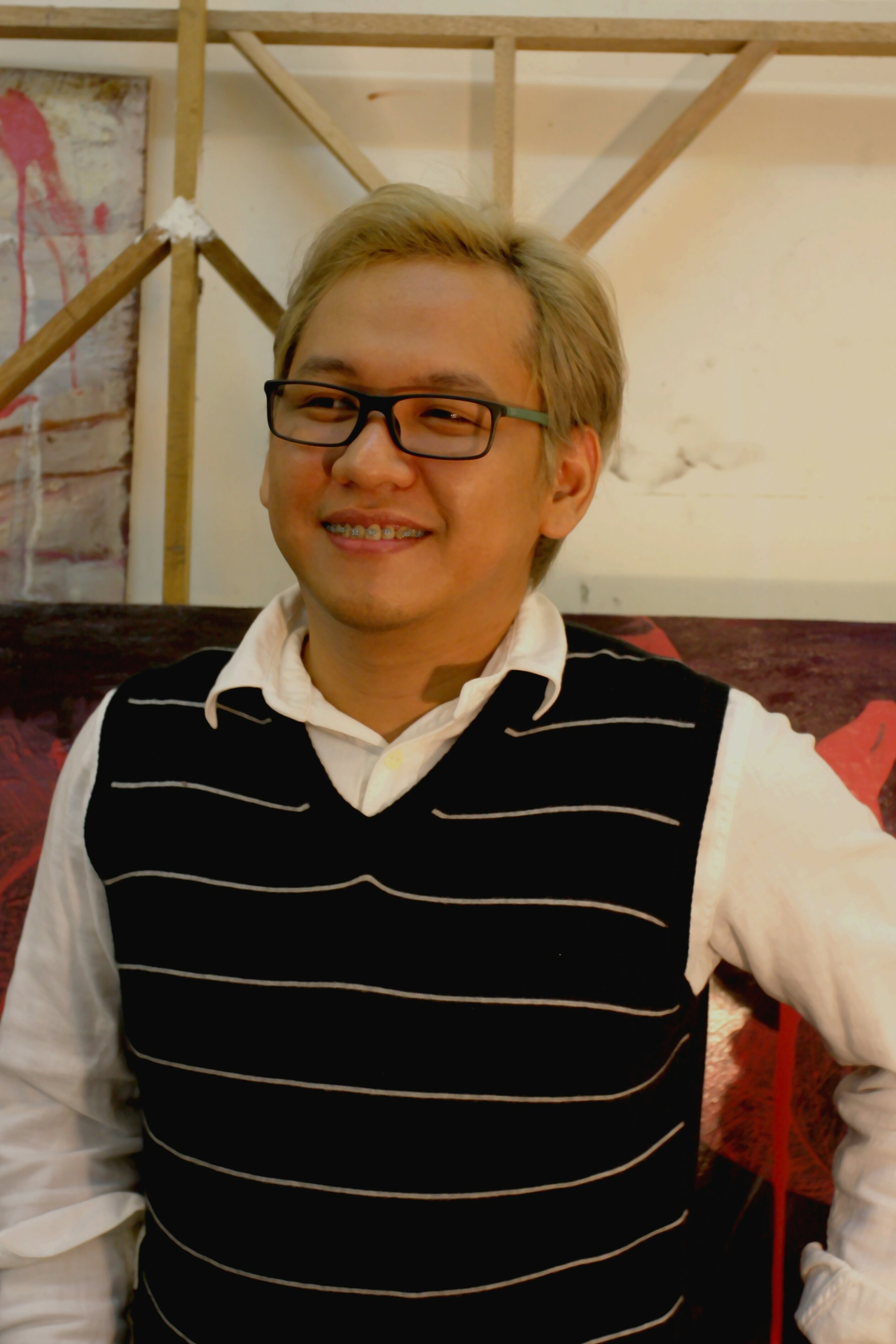
- Portrait of Winner Jumalon
- Education: University of the Philippines College of Fine Arts
- Website: winnerjumalon.com

Winner Jumalon (born 28 December 1983, in Zamboanga, Philippines) is a Manila-based Filipino modern visual artist. His works with oil and encaustic on canvas have been described as "late capitalist masterpieces marred by illogical marks, haze, and aggregations of reality that not only displaces portraiture as the totemic symbols of power and status but questions the formation of identity itself as the trap where a man cannot go forward".

Jumalon was awarded the Artist Award of the Cultural Center of the Philippines in 2009, and has been represented by both Sotheby's and Christie's with consecutively increasing valuations in the secondary market. Jumalon has denied that economic success informs his paintings, and states that his works are instead antagonistic to the dictatorship and reification of the market. His projects seek a re-evaluation of some of the most fundamental positions that art has assumed in the past.

== Biography ==
Jumalon trained for four years at the Philippine High School for the Arts at Mt. Makiling, Los Banos, Laguna, with a major in Visual Arts. After high school, Jumalon pursued his childhood dream of entering the College of Fine Arts of the University of the Philippines in Diliman, Quezon City. He graduated with a baccalaureate in fine arts, majoring in painting.

== Work ==
The dialogue of Jumalon's work features spaces he inhabits or inhabited. These spaces include Zamboanga, his childhood home; Laguna, where he was a Philippine government scholar; and Quezon City, where he studied fine arts in UP.

Jumalon says that these spaces are connected to his identity. His relationship with art developed with his connection with the people and places around him. Teachers, friends and everyday moments have shaped the life he has lived. His work evolves from these encounters. In this specific sense, the art is not separate from his surroundings, but becomes a way of understanding and responding to them instead.

Jumalon finds inspiration in almost anything around him, a passing moment of time, a piece of debris or a potted plant. He draws from the past but brings it into the present. This makes him not treat nostalgia simply as memory, but as a way of noticing what continues to remain relevant. He often begins with an idea and then challenges himself to translate into a visual form capable of carrying it. The material he chooses and the way they are used are all part of that specific process. Once the idea is proven worth of pursuing, paint, material, and hard work becomes the means through which it begins to take shape.

For Jumalon, the process involves developing an idea and exploring how it can be expressed visually. The work draws from everyday environments around him, specifically the urban spaces he inhabits and incorporates their objects, textures and visual elements. These surroundings provide both subject matter and context for the work. Through this approach, he connects his observations of everyday life with the materials and forms used to construct his pieces.

Back in his native land, he painted mostly colorful self-portraits. It came to pass, he started using a layering technique, and drawing faces over faces, an observation perhaps, watching fellow students with their diverse individuality go under guises just to create that harmony.

Spending his high school life in Laguna has been still artistically inclined having visual arts as his major. His paintings were done in subdued earth colors. He was then living in a mountain where his school is located, learning the rigors of the academic world.

Later works played with wide spaces and abstract figures, graffiti, and black scratches on white background.

== Awards ==
=== Accolades ===
- 2005
  - Top 5 Finalist in Philip Morris Award ASEAN Art Competition
- 2003
  - Top 50 Finalist in Philip Morris ASEAN Art Competition
  - Finalist (Water media on paper category) Metrobank Art Competition
  - Jose Moreno Scholarship Pitoy Moreno Foundation
  - Best Artwork for the Philippine Collegian
  - Best Editorial Cartoon for the Philippine Collegian
- 2002
  - Finalist (oil/acrylic category) in 35th National Shell Art Competition
  - Semi-Finalist (Oil on Canvas) Metrobank Art Competition
- 2001
  - Honorable Mention in 34th National Shell Art Competition

=== Solo exhibitions ===
- 2010
  - A Part, Winner Jumalon Solo Exhibit runs from 6 to 30 June at Pinto Art Gallery, #1 Sierra Madre Heights, Grandheights, Antipolo City.
- 2008
  - Eslite Gallery Taipei, Taiwan
- 2007
  - Destroyed Images Ark Galerie Jakarta
- 2006
  - Face Values, Richard Koh Fine Art in Kuala Lumpur, Malaysia
- 2005
  - About Face, The Drawing Room in Makati, Philippines

=== Group exhibitions ===
- 2010
  - Pachingguel “Pach” Hortillanos, Winner JumalonRecent Find, Manila Contemporary
- 2008
  - Showcase Singapore, Singapore
  - Hong Kong International Art Fair, Hong Kong
  - CIGE 2008 Beijing Art Fair, Beijing, China
  - Bridge Art Fair New York, New York, U.S.A.
- 2007
  - Scope Miami, The Drawing Room @ Miami, Florida, U.S.A.
  - Art Singapore, The Drawing Room, Level 4, Suntec Building, Singapore
- 2006
  - The Drawing Room @Dubai Art Fair International Exhibitions & Conferences
  - the United Arab Emirates >ART Singapore, The Drawing Room, Level 6, Suntec Building, Singapore
  - New Directions, The Rotunda Gallery, Neilson Hays Library, 195 Surawong Road, Bangkok, Thailand
  - Utterly Art & The Drawing Room South Bridge Road, Singapore
- 2005
  - Art Taipei 2005 Taipei, Taiwan
  - Art Singapore 2005 The Drawing Room, Suntec Building, Singapore
- 2004
  - Asian Art Contemporary Singapore The Drawing Room, Suntec Building, Singapore
- 2003
  - Top 50 Finalists Metropolitan Museum, Roxas Blvd., Manila, Philippines
    - Art Rush Metrobank Plaza, Makati Avenue, Makati, Philippines
    - “Box Environment” Ayala Museum, Stock Exchange Bldg., Makati, Philippines
- 2002
  - Metrobank Art Competition Metrobank Plaza, Makati Avenue, Makati, Philippines
    - 35th Shell Art Competition SM Megamall, Artwalk, Mandaluyong, Philippines
- 2001
  - 34th Shell Art Competition Greenhills, San Juan, Philippines
    - “I-Works” Nemiranda Arthouse, SM Megamall, Mandaluyong, Philippines
    - “Anim-a” Thesis Exhibition UP Faculty Center, Diliman, Quezon City, Philippines
- 2000
  - "Makiling sa Tabi ng Dagat” Cultural Center of the Philippines

== Resources ==
http://misc.inquirer.net/nokia/youngartists/profile.html
http://www.drawingroomgallery.com/pdf/winner_jumalon.pdf
http://www.manilaartblogger.com/2010/06/07/winner-jumalons-unusual-portraits/
http://www.utterlyart.com.sg/artists/view/83
http://angfierranijuana.wordpress.com/tag/winner-jumalon/
http://www.drawingroomgallery.com/contemporary/images/artworks/5/press/1134025247.pdf
http://www.artslant.com/ew/events/show/248275-recent-find
