= Julius Schück =

German-Filipino merchant and politician

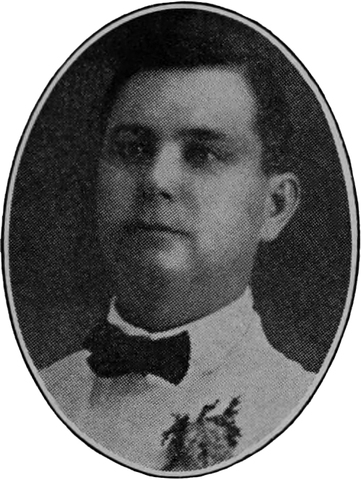
- Schück as member of the Philippine House of Representatives, c. 1921

Member of the House of Representatives of the Philippines from Mindanao and Sulu's Lone district (Note: Other sources mentioned Mindanao and Sulu having legislative districts from 1916 to 1935.)
- In office 1920–1922 (Note: resigned on November 15, 1921)
- Appointed by: Francis Burton Harrison

Personal details
- Born: April 8, 1880 Jolo, Sultanate of Sulu
- Died: 1952 (aged 71–72) Jolo, Sulu, Philippines
- Education: Raffles Institution

Julius Yap Schück (April 8, 1880 – 1952) was a German-Filipino merchant and politician who represented Mindanao and Sulu in the House of Representatives from 1920 to 1922.

== Biography ==
Schück was born on April 8, 1880, in Jolo, Sulu. His father was Herman Leopold Schück, a German sea captain, and Sharifa Yap, a Chinese Muslim woman. He graduated from Raffles Institution in Singapore and served as an official interpreter and senior officer in Sulu. He was elected to the provincial board in June 1915 until November 1920. He was appointed representative of the Department of Mindanao and Sulu in 1920 replacing Isidro Vamenta. He resigned as representative on November 15, 1921. Despite resigning, he still served the position until 1922.

== Personal life ==
His wife is a daughter of Sheikh Mustafa, prime minister of Sultan Harun Ar-Rashid. He and his brother, Willie Schück, were engaged in the timber business.

His father, Herman Schück, had blood brotherhood with the Sultan of Sulu, Jamal ul-Azam. As a sign of gratitude for the German, the sultan gave Herman Schück a piece of land in Lukat Lupas near Jolo.
