= Mindanao and Sulu's at-large congressional district =

At-large Philippine legislative district for the Department of Mindanao and Sulu

- Former constituency for the House of Representatives of the Philippines
- Provinces administered by the Department of Mindanao and Sulu within the Philippines

Former constituency
- Created: 1916
- Abolished: 1935

Mindanao and Sulu's at-large congressional district was the sole congressional district representing the provinces administered by the Department of Mindanao and Sulu under the Insular Government of the Philippine Islands from 1916 to 1935.

== List of members representing the district ==
=== House of Representatives (1916–1935) ===
Seat A					Seat B					Seat C					Seat D					Seat E					Legislature	Constituency
Portrait	Member (Lifespan)	Term of office	Party	Electoral history	Portrait	Member (Lifespan)	Term of office	Party	Electoral history	Portrait	Member (Lifespan)	Term of office	Party	Electoral history	Portrait	Member (Lifespan)	Term of office	Party	Electoral history	Portrait	Member (Lifespan)	Term of office	Party	Electoral history	Legislature	Constituency
	Rafael Acuña (1874–1945)	1917–1919	Nacionalista	Appointed by Governor-General Francis Burton Harrison.		Datu Piang (1846–1933)	1917–1922	Independent	Appointed by Governor-General Francis Burton Harrison.		Teodoro Palma Gil (1861–1935)	1917–1925	Nacionalista	Appointed by Governor-General Francis Burton Harrison.		Datu Benito	1917–1919	Independent	Appointed by Governor-General Francis Burton Harrison.		Pablo Lorenzo (1887–1968)	1917–1925	Nacionalista	Appointed by Governor-General Francis Burton Harrison.	4th Legislature	1917–1935; Provinces: Agusan, Bukidnon, Cotabato, Davao, Lanao, Sulu, Zamboanga
	Isidro Vamenta	1919–1920	Nacionalista	Appointed by Governor-General Francis Burton Harrison.		Datu Piang (1846–1933)	1917–1922	Independent	Appointed by Governor-General Francis Burton Harrison.		Teodoro Palma Gil (1861–1935)	1917–1925	Nacionalista	Appointed by Governor-General Francis Burton Harrison.		Datu Tampugaw (1886–c. 1934)	1919–1925	Independent	Appointed by Governor-General Francis Burton Harrison.		Pablo Lorenzo (1887–1968)	1917–1925	Nacionalista	Appointed by Governor-General Francis Burton Harrison.	5th Legislature	1917–1935; Provinces: Agusan, Bukidnon, Cotabato, Davao, Lanao, Sulu, Zamboanga
	Julius Schück (1880–1952)	1920–1922	Independent	Appointed by Governor-General Francis Burton Harrison.		Datu Piang (1846–1933)	1917–1922	Independent	Appointed by Governor-General Francis Burton Harrison.		Teodoro Palma Gil (1861–1935)	1917–1925	Nacionalista	Appointed by Governor-General Francis Burton Harrison.		Datu Tampugaw (1886–c. 1934)	1919–1925	Independent	Appointed by Governor-General Francis Burton Harrison.		Pablo Lorenzo (1887–1968)	1917–1925	Nacionalista	Appointed by Governor-General Francis Burton Harrison.	5th Legislature	1917–1935; Provinces: Agusan, Bukidnon, Cotabato, Davao, Lanao, Sulu, Zamboanga
	Rafael Acuña (1874–1945)	1922–1925	Nacionalista Colectivista	Appointed by Governor-General Leonard Wood.		Ugalingan Piang (1896–1949)	1922–1925	Nacionalista Unipersonalista	Appointed by Governor-General Leonard Wood.		Teodoro Palma Gil (1861–1935)	1917–1925	Nacionalista Unipersonalista	Appointed by Governor-General Leonard Wood.		Datu Tampugaw (1886–c. 1934)	1919–1925	Independent	Appointed by Governor-General Leonard Wood.		Pablo Lorenzo (1887–1968)	1917–1925	Nacionalista Unipersonalista	Appointed by Governor-General Leonard Wood.	6th Legislature	1917–1935; Provinces: Agusan, Bukidnon, Cotabato, Davao, Lanao, Sulu, Zamboanga
	Pedro de la Llana	1925–1928	Independent	Appointed by Governor-General Leonard Wood.		Abdullah Piang	1925–1928	Independent	Appointed by Governor-General Leonard Wood.		Arsenio Suazo	1925–1928	Independent	Appointed by Governor-General Leonard Wood.		Jose P. Melencio	1925–1931	Independent	Appointed by Governor-General Leonard Wood.	Vacant					7th Legislature	1917–1935; Provinces: Agusan, Bukidnon, Cotabato, Davao, Lanao, Sulu, Zamboanga
	Jose G. Sanvictores	1928–1934	Nacionalista	Appointed by Governor-General Henry L. Stimson.		Mónico R. Mercado (1875–1952)	1928–1931	Nacionalista	Appointed by Governor-General Henry L. Stimson.		Jose Artadi (1891–1959)	1928–1931	Independent	Appointed by Governor-General Henry L. Stimson.		Jose P. Melencio	1925–1931	Independent	Appointed by Governor-General Henry L. Stimson.		Tabahur Taupan	1928–1931	Independent	Appointed by Governor-General Henry L. Stimson.	8th Legislature	1917–1935; Provinces: Agusan, Bukidnon, Cotabato, Davao, Lanao, Sulu, Zamboanga
	Jose G. Sanvictores	1928–1934	Nacionalista	Appointed by Governor-General Dwight F. Davis.		Datu Sinsuat	1931–1934	Independent	Appointed by Governor-General Dwight F. Davis.		Francisco Bangoy (1870–1935)	1931–1934	Nacionalista	Appointed by Governor-General Dwight F. Davis.		Datu Ibra Gundarangin	1931–1934	Independent	Appointed by Governor-General Dwight F. Davis.		Agustin Luceo Alvarez (1890–1946)	1931–1934	Nacionalista	Appointed by Governor-General Dwight F. Davis.	9th Legislature	1917–1935; Provinces: Agusan, Bukidnon, Cotabato, Davao, Lanao, Sulu, Zamboanga
	Manuel Fortich (1878–1943)	1934–1935	Nacionalista Democratico	Appointed by Governor-General Frank Murphy.		Julian A. Rodriguez	1934–1935	Nacionalista Democratico	Appointed by Governor-General Frank Murphy.		Doroteo Karagdag (1878–1947)	1934–1935	Nacionalista Democratico	Appointed by Governor-General Frank Murphy.		Alauya Alonto (c. 1875–1959)	1934–1935	Nacionalista Democratico	Appointed by Governor-General Frank Murphy.		Ombra Amilbangsa	1934–1935	Nacionalista Democratico	Appointed by Governor-General Frank Murphy.	10th Legislature	1917–1935; Provinces: Agusan, Bukidnon, Cotabato, Davao, Lanao, Sulu, Zamboanga
District dissolved into Agusan's at-large, Bukidnon's at-large, Cotabato's at-large, Davao's at-large, Lanao's at-large, Sulu's at-large, and Zamboanga's at-large districts for the Commonwealth National Assembly.

== Sources ==
- "Roster of Philippine Legislators (1907 - 2019)" (PDF). House of Representatives of the Philippines. 2019. Archived (PDF) from the original on August 13, 2025.
