= Ombra Amilbangsa =

- اُمْبْرَ اَمِلْبَڠْسَ
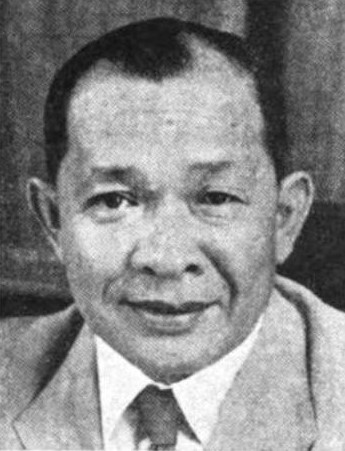

Member of the Philippine House of Representatives from Sulu's Lone District
- In office May 5, 1951 – December 30, 1961
- Preceded by: Gulamu Rasul
- Succeeded by: Salih Ututalum
- In office June 9, 1945 – December 30, 1949
- Preceded by: District recreated
- Succeeded by: Gulamu Rasul

Member of the National Assembly from Sulu's Lone District
- In office September 25, 1943 – February 2, 1944 Serving with Gulamu Rasul
- In office September 16, 1935 – December 30, 1938
- Preceded by: District recreated
- Succeeded by: Gulamu Rasul

Member of the House of Representatives of the Philippine Islands from Department of Mindanao and Sulu's Lone District
- In office 1934 – September 16, 1935 Serving with Manuel Fortich, Julian A. Rodriguez, Julian A. Rodriguez, and Alauya Alonto

Sultan of Sulu
- In office 1935 – 1964

Personal details
- Born: 15 March 1905 Simunul, Sultanate of Sulu
- Party: Liberal (1946-1961)
- Other political affiliations: Nacionalista (1934-1943; 1945-1946); KALIBAPI (1943-1945)
- Spouse: Dayang Dayang Piandao; Hja.Kabila Amilbangsa
- Children: Sultan Shariful Eric Amilbangsa, Dayang-Dayang Scheherazade Amilbangsa, Dayang-Dayang Veronica Amilbangsa Balagtas & Dayang-Dayang Aysha Amilbangsa Asakil (adopted daughter)
- Known for: Being successor to the Sultanate of Sulu 1936-1964

Ombra Amilbangsa was a claimant Sultan of Sulu and a Filipino politician. He also served as a member of the House of Representatives of the Philippines and the National Assembly of the Philippines for the Department of Mindanao and Sulu (1934–1935) and Sulu (1935–1938, 1943–1944, 1945–1949, 1951–1961).

Amilbangsa filed a House Bill No. 5682 in 1961 before the House of Representatives during the fourth session of the 4th Congress which calls for the granting of independence to the Province of Sulu as a sovereign nation due to what he felt was negligence of the central government over the concerns of his province. The measure was not acted upon by the Congress. According to an autobiography about Moro leader, Nur Misuari, Amilbangsa favored the inclusion of the disputed areas in North Borneo to an envisioned independent Sultanate of Sulu.

Amilbangsa married Sultanah Dayang-Dayang Hadji Piandao Kiram of the House of Kiram then was proclaimed as Sultan of Sulu on 1936 and this was agreed by the Council of Royal Datus and Rumah Bichara and also agreed by Sultan Jamalul Kiram II when he approved the marriage of Amilbangsa with Dayang-Dayang Hadji Piandao the daughter of Sultan Badarudin II. He was never recognized by the Philippine Government as a legitimate Sultan of Sulu.
