= Dayang Dayang Piandao =

- Born: 1886
- Died: After World War II
- Spouse: Ombra Amilbangsa
- House: Kiram
- Father: Sultan Badarud-Din
- Mother: Hadji Amina

Hadji Dayang Dayang Piandao (Note: Also written as Dayang Dayang Hadji Piandao) was a Tausug royal who was the adopted daughter and only child of Jamalul Kiram II.

== Early life ==
Piandao, who would later became known by her title Dayang Dayang (lit. 'princess of the first degree') was born in 1886 to Sultan Badarud-Din and Hadji Amina of the Sultanate of Sulu. Her father Badarud Din died before her birth. She was adopted by her father's brother and successor Jamalul Kiram II as his daughter and only heir.

The Dayang Dayang mastered the Quran at age eight after one year of study. She made the Hajj to the Mecca accompanying her uncle and Hadji Butu.

From her childhood, she accompanied the sultan during his annual visits to Sandakan and British Singapore, where the monarch had interest. She also enjoyed the command of the sultan's five hundred slaves before the abolishment of slavery in the sultanate.

She was not allowed to do work during her mother's lifetime or until around she was 28-years old. She was not even allowed to visit a neighboring house from her residence.

== Adulthood ==
The Sultanate of Sulu surrendered its sovereignty to the United States-backed Insular Government of the Philippines in 1915 through the Carpenter Agreement. Jamalul Kiram II was allowed to keep his title and role as head of Islam in Sulu.

After her mother's death, Dayang Dayang Piandao was entrusted with the management of the extensive property of the Sultan of Sulu roughly worth around ₱250,000.She was the chief advisor of the sultan on personal matters and also fulfilled executive and administrative roles. She also relayed the gifts from the sultan to his wives and close relatives.

During the American colonial period of the Philippines, The Dayang Dayang sought the promotion of ties between the Moro and Christian settlers. In 1921, the Philippine administration appointed her as agent to promote the sending of Moro children to formal schools.

=== 1936 succession crisis ===
After Kiram II's death on June 7, 1936, a succession crisis occurred. With the grand vizier and other traditional leaders in Sulu not keen on a female ruler, Kiram II's brother Rajah Muda Mawalil Wasit Kiram was elected as the successor in July 1936.

Meanwhile, the Dayang Dayang being friends with First Lady Aurora Quezon wife of President Manuel L. Quezon, had the backing of the Philippine Commonwealth. The Dayang Dayang wanted her husband Ombra Amilbangsa to be enthroned.

In November 1936, Muwallil Wasit II died without a formal coronation taking place.

=== 1939 Macaskie Judgment ===
The high court of North Borneo in a decision known as the 1939 Macaskie Judgment named Dayang Dayang Piandao as one of the nine principal heirs of Sultan Jamalul Kiram II. The British North Borneo Company is made to compensate the heirs for its administration of what would later be known as Sabah. Malaysia later assumed this obligation paying the heirs what it considers as "cession money" and which the heirs consider as "rent".

== Death ==
Dayang Dayang Piandao died of cancer sometime after World War II. She did not have children.
