= Lina Cabrera =

Filipino politician (born 1954)

- Official portrait, 2025

22nd and 27th Mayor of Sasmuan
- Incumbent
- Assumed office June 30, 2022
- Vice Mayor: Mamerto Tamayo Jr.
- Preceded by: Nardo Velasco
- In office June 30, 1998 – June 30, 2007
- Preceded by: Fernando Baltazar
- Succeeded by: Nardo Velasco

Member of the Philippine House of Representatives for ALE Partylist
- In office June 30, 2010 – June 30, 2013

Member of the Pampanga Provincial Board from the 2nd district
- In office June 30, 2007 – June 30, 2010 Serving with Arthur Salalila and Edna David

Personal details
- Born: Catalina Mendoza Cabrera; June 28, 1954 (age 72) Sexmoán, Pampanga, Philippines
- Party: Lakas (2004–present); KAMBILAN (local party; 2024–present)
- Other political affiliations: ALE (2009–2016); KAMPI (2007–2008); NPC (until 2004)
- Spouse(s): Ramon Catacutan; Manuelito Bagasina (separated)
- Occupation: Politician

Catalina "Lina" Mendoza Cabrera (born June 28, 1954), formerly known as Lina Bagasina, is a Filipino politician. She has served as 27th Mayor of Sasmuan since 2022, a position she previously held as 22nd mayor from 1998 to 2007. She served as representative for ALE Partylist from 2010 to 2013.

== Political career ==
Cabrera became the first female mayor of Sasmuan from 1998 to 2007.

Cabrera was elected as member of the Pampanga Provincial Board from 2007 to 2010.

In 2010, Cabrera won as a first nominee and represented the ALE Partylist.

In 2019, Cabrera ran for mayor of Sasmuan but lost to Nardo Velasco and garnered 7,288 votes.

In the 2022 elections, Cabrera returned as mayor of Sasmuan with 9,373 votes.

== Personal life ==
Cabrera was previously married to Manuelito Bagasina. She later married Ramon Catacutan.

== See also ==
- List of female members of the House of Representatives of the Philippines
