= Datu Tampugaw =

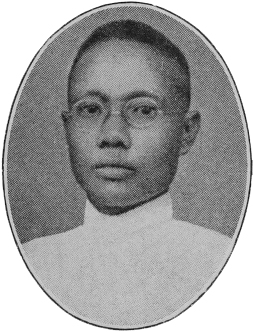

Member of the House of Representatives of the Philippines from Mindanao and Sulu's Lone district (Note: Other sources mentioned Mindanao and Sulu having legislative districts from 1916 to 1935.)
- In office September 6, 1919 – 1925
- Appointed by: Francis Burton Harrison; Leonard Wood

Personal details
- Born: 25 September 1886 Tubaran, Confederate States of Lanao
- Died: c. 1934
- Known for: Sultan of Lanao (Royal House of Pagayawan)

Datu Amay-Tampugaw (25 September 1886 – c. 1934), also spelled Amai Tampugao, known as Sultan Tampugao of Tubaran, was a Filipino politician who became member of the House of Representatives representing Mindanao and Sulu from 1919 to 1925. Before becoming a member, he was sultan of the Royal House of Pagayawan, Confederate States of Lanao.

== Biography ==
Tampugaw was born on September 25, 1886, in Tubaran, Lanao province. As a devout Muslim, he studied the Quran and attended a Maranao school. He then became the sultan of the Royal House of Pagayawan, Confederate States of Lanao. (Note: other sources refer to him as sultan of Pangayawan, Lanao)

=== Moro Rebellion ===
In 1902, General Adna R. Chaffee wrote to Datu Adta of Paigoay, Sultan Pandapatan of Bayang, and Tampugaw asking them to send "assassins" to kill Moro rebel leaders and to make restitutions for the damages made by their followers. Chaffee also gave a stern warning for the three if they don't comply. As sultan, Tampugaw complied with the demands of American authorities during the Moro Rebellion due to the persuasion from an Afghan high priest from Rio Grande.

At first, the Americans were doubtful of trusting Tampugaw of providing useful information to counter the rebellion. Tampugaw shared details about the dangers posed by the cottas of Maciu and Bacolod, explaining their beliefs about killing Moros would "displease the Almighty" while killing the Americans would guarantee a place in heaven. However, when he was confronted by Captain John J. Pershing with evidence of a neighboring datu's actions, he became a trusted informant.

=== Post-rebellion and political career ===
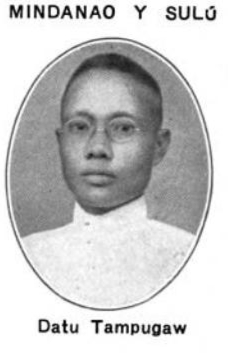
Tampugaw as member of the House of Representatives, published c. 1923

During the American colonial government, he served president of the municipal district of Tubaran. General Leonard Wood praised Tampugaw for his cooperation with American authorities making Lanao a suitable place to build a small school. However, aside from the datu and a few Muslim elites, Lanao was still a troublesome district for American authorities.

On September 6, 1919, Tampugaw was appointed by Governor General Francis Burton Harrison as a member of the Philippine Assembly representing Mindanao and Sulu. During the administration of Leonard Wood, he was one of the politicians that threatened to resign during the 1923 cabinet crisis, but his submission for resignation was rejected by the governor general. He was reappointed as member of the assembly in 1922 until 1925 representing Mindanao and Sulu.

During the Fifth Legislature, he was member of the Navigation Committee. During the Sixth Legislature, he was member of the Committee on Mindanao Affairs and Special Governments.
