= Carlos Camins =

Filipino politician (1887–1970)

Governor of Zamboanga
- In office 1931–1934
- Preceded by: Agustin Alvarez
- Succeeded by: Felipe Ramos

Personal details
- Born: November 4, 1887 Zamboanga, Zamboanga, Captaincy General of the Philippines
- Died: August 11, 1970 (aged 82) Zamboanga City, Philippines
- Spouse: Josefina Silva Y Solis

Carlos Camins y Hernandez (November 4, 1887 – August 11, 1970) was the former governor of the old Zamboanga Province from 1931 to 1934. His parents were Francisco Camins, a member of the Spanish Navy Unit stationed in Zamboanga and the Portuguese Mariquita Hernandez Camins. Camins studied in Manila. He was a journalist, publisher and editor of El Finex, a Spanish newspaper, La Anorcha and El Sur. During his term as governor he developed the Abuano Barracks in the municipality of Aurora, now under the province of Zamboanga del Sur.

== See also ==
- Zamboanga City
