= Bureau of Non-Christian Tribes =

Filipino defunct government agency

Agency overview
- Formed: 2 October 1901
- Dissolved: 24 October 1936
- Jurisdiction: Philippine Islands
- Parent department: Department of the Interior

The Bureau of Non-Christian Tribes was an agency of the United States colonial government in the Philippine Islands, under the Department of the Interior that was tasked to conduct systematic investigations with reference to the non-Christian tribes of the colony, to ascertain the name of each tribe, the limits of their respective territory, population, their social organizations, languages, beliefs, manners, and customs. The bureau aimed to determine to the most practicable means "for bringing about their advancement in civilization and material prosperity". It was also tasked to review the practical operation of laws in reference to non-Christian tribes in the Islands.

The bureau was created by an act of the Philippine Commission in 1901.

== See also ==
- National Commission on Indigenous Peoples
