= Zamboanga (province) =

Former province of the Philippines

- Province of the Philippines
- 1914–1952
- Location of the historical province of Zamboanga.
- Capital: Zamboanga (1914-1942); Dipolog (1942-1948); Molave (1948-1952)
- History
  - Established: 1 September 1914
  - Splitting of Zamboanga: 6 June 1952
Preceded by	Succeeded by
Moro Province	Zamboanga del Norte; Zamboanga del Sur
- Today part of: · Basilan · Zamboanga City · Zamboanga del Norte · Zamboanga del Sur · Zamboanga Sibugay

Zamboanga (also Zamboaŋga) was a province of the Philippines located in the western region of the southern island of Mindanao, Philippines.

== History ==
=== Creation ===
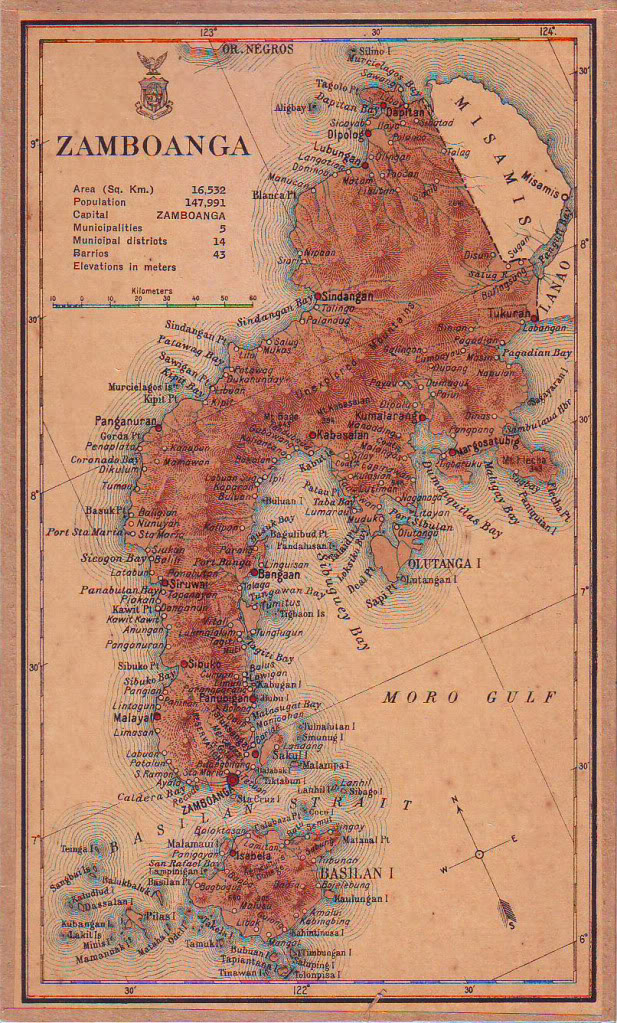
Map of Zamboanga province in 1918

During the time of the United States' purchase of the Philippines (1898), the Republic of Zamboanga had its own independence and jurisdiction on what is now Zamboanga City. After the dissolution of the republic, Zamboanga was eventually consolidated into one major administrative area by the American government of the Philippines, consisting of an enormous region that was the Mindanao island's western peninsula, Basilan Island, and the entire Sulu archipelago, with the ancient namesake town/fort of Zamboanga as the seat of its government, and was called the Moro Province of the Philippines.

The Moro Province, in 1914 was replaced by the Department of Mindanao and Sulu. It was divided into Zamboanga, Sulu, Cotabato, Davao, Agusan and Surigao. The town of Zamboanga as its capital. Luis Lim was appointed as the first governor of Zamboanga.

In 1920, the Department of Mindanao and Sulu was officially dissolved and Zamboanga became an independent province. In 1922, elections were held for the first elected provincial officials of Zamboanga. Florentino Saguin was elected as first elected governor.

At that time, the province was composed of five municipalities:

- Dipolog
- Dapitan
- Lubungan
- Isabela
- Zamboanga

Zamboanga was also sub-divided into 12 municipal districts:

- Bangaan
- Dinas
- Kabasalan
- Kumalarang
- Lamitan
- Maluso
- Margosatubig
- Panganuran
- Sibuko
- Sindangan
- Sirawai
- Taluksangay

=== World War II ===
When the Japanese invaded the Philippines, Zamboanga acting Governor Felipe Azcuna moved the capital from Zamboanga City to Dipolog. After the defeat of the American-Filipino forces in Corregidor, most of the province went under Japanese control.

After the war, on June 16, 1948, Molave was designated as Zamboanga's capital by the virtue of Republic Act No. 286 signed by President Elpidio Quirino.

=== Division ===
On June 6, 1952, the Republic Act 711, authored by Zamboanga Congressman Roseller Lim was passed by the Philippine House of Representatives to divide the province of Zamboanga to Zamboanga del Norte and Zamboanga del Sur, while the chartered city of Zamboanga and Basilan became part of Zamboanga del Sur. The bill was signed by President Elpidio Quirino in a ceremony held at the Malacañan Palace.

The towns of Dapitan, Dipolog, Rizal, New Piñan, Polanco, Katipunan, Manukan, Sindangan, Liloy, Labason and Siocon were under the province of Zamboanga del Norte, while the city of Zamboanga, the island of Basilan, and the towns of Molave, Pagadian, Labangan, Margosatubig, Dimataling, Dinas, Ipil, Buug, Malangas, Kabasalan and Aurora were under Zamboanga del Sur.

The town of Dipolog was designated capital of Zamboanga del Norte and the town of Pagadian as Zamboanga del Sur's capital.

In 2001, a brand new Zamboanga province, Zamboanga Sibugay, was created from the province of Zamboanga del Sur with Ipil as its provincial capital.

=== Governors ===
Governor	Portrait	Term	Notes	Ref.
DISTRICT OF ZAMBOANGA
Luis Lim		July 23, 1914–1917	Lim was the first appointed civil governor of the province.	
Agustin Alvarez		1917–1920	Alvarez succeeded Lim in 1917 as governor and reelected in 1928. In 1940, he was elected Zamboanga City Mayor.	
PROVINCE OF ZAMBOANGA
Agustin Alvarez		1920–1922		
Florentino Adasa Saguin		1922–1925	Saguin was the first elected governor of the province. He later represented Zamboanga in the 1934 Constitutional Convention.	
Jose Dalman Aseniero		1925–1928	Aseniero formerly served as Municipal President of Dapitan before elected Governor.	
Agustin Alvarez		1928–1931		
Carlos Hernandez Camins		1931–1934		
Felipe Ramos		1934–1937	Ramos previously served as Municipal President of Zamboanga City from 1925 to 1934 before being elected Governor.	
Matias Castillon Ranillo		1937–1940	Ranillo was later elected representative of Zamboanga's Lone District in 1941. When war broke out, he was appointed as the province's military governor.	
Felipe B. Azcuna		1940–1941	Azcuna was a member of the Provincial Board before elected as governor. He was reelected governor in 1948.	
WORLD WAR II
Lazaro Alfabeto		1945–1946	Alfabeto was appointed governor after Zamboanga was liberated.	
Leoncio Sagario Hamoy		1946–1948	Hamoy was appointed Provincial Fiscal before becoming governor.	
Felipe B. Azcuna		1948–December 30, 1949	Azcuna would become Zamboanga del Norte's first governor when the province becomes divided in 1952.	
Serapio Datoc		December 30, 1949–June 6, 1952	Datoc served as Zamboanga's last governor When the province was divided, Datoc became Zamboanga del Sur's first governor.	

== Timeline ==
=== Post-War Period ===
- 1970 – Local Government troops invaded Zamboanga and cleared the fields against the Islamic rebels of the Moro National Liberation Front (MNLF) that began the Islamic Insurgencies.
- September 21, 1972 – Then President Ferdinand E. Marcos declared Martial Law in the Philippines.
- November 14, 1984 – Then Zamboanga City Mayor Cesar Climaco was assassinated and shot dead in downtown Zamboanga City.
- February 22–25, 1986 – EDSA People Power Revolution. Corazon A. Aquino was the first woman president and 11th President of the Philippines when she was declared as the winner of the 1986 presidential election after the EDSA People Power Revolution.
- January 5, 1989 – Camp Cawa-Cawa siege in Zamboanga City; government forces assaulted the camp where Gen. Eduardo Batalla and Col. Romeo Abendan of the Philippine Constabulary were being held hostage by rogue Muslim policemen led by Rizal Alih.

== See also ==
- Legislative district of Zamboanga
- Provinces of the Philippines
