= Department of Mindanao and Sulu =

Former US colonial administration in the Philippines

- Departamento de Mindanao y Joló
- Coat of arms

- Provinces administered highlighted in red.

Administrative Agency overview
- Formed: July 23, 1914
- Dissolved: May 5, 1920
- Superseding Administrative Agency: Bureau of Non-Christian Tribes
- Type: Agency of the United States to the Philippine Islands
- Jurisdiction: Agusan, Bukidnon, Cotabato, Davao, Lanao, Zamboanga, Sulu
- Status: Defunct
- Governor responsible: Frank C. Carpenter

The Department of Mindanao and Sulu was an agency of the United States colonial administration in the Philippine Islands task to administer all Muslim-dominated areas in the territory. It was established on July 23, 1914, pursuant to Act No. 2408, replacing the Moro Province after the latter was divided into the then districts/provinces of Zamboanga, Lanao, Cotabato, Davao, and Sulu. It was later split into provinces/regions organized under the Department of Mindanao and Sulu, along with the former provinces of Agusan, and current province of Bukidnon.

== Government ==
A civil government replaced the Moro Province's government. The Legislative Council was replaced with an advisory body called the Administrative Council and its legislative power was diverted to the Philippine Commission.

The provincial government of the seven provinces was vested in a Provincial Board to be composed of a governor, a secretary-treasurer, and a third member. The governor and the secretary-treasurer is appointed by the department governor subject to the confirmation of the governor-general. The third member is elected by the presidents and councilors of all the municipal districts of province.

In 1915, the region's Department of Public Instruction became part of the Bureau of Education. It was slowly integrated into the overall system, with this process finishing in 1922.

=== Provinces ===
The department encompassed seven provinces:

- Agusan
- Bukidnon
- Cotabato
- Davao
- Lanao
- Zamboanga
- Sulu

== Suffrage ==
The right to vote for the municipal officers was given to males of at least twenty-five (25) years of age with at least six (6) months legal residence in the town. One who held a position before the American occupation; had an annual property worth ₱500.00 or paid at least ₱30.00 in taxes annually; and could spell, read, or write English or Spanish.

== Abolition ==
It was eventually abolished in 1920, after the responsibility for the administration of Moro lands was transferred to the Bureau of Non-Christian Tribes of the Philippines' Department of the Interior. It was headed by a governor, subordinate to the US Governor-General of the Philippine Islands. Frank C. Carpenter served as its governor from 1914 to 1920.

== See also ==
- Mindanao and Sulu's at-large congressional district
