= History of Basilan =

Philippine provincial history

Basilan is an island province of the Philippines. It is the largest and northernmost of the major islands of the Sulu Archipelago and is located just off the southern coast of Zamboanga Peninsula. Its capital is Lamitan. Basilan is home to three main ethnic groups, the indigenous Yakans, and the later-arriving Tausugs and Zamboangueños. The Yakans and Tausugs are predominantly Muslim, while the Chavacanos are mainly Christian. There are also a number of smaller groups.

== Etymology ==
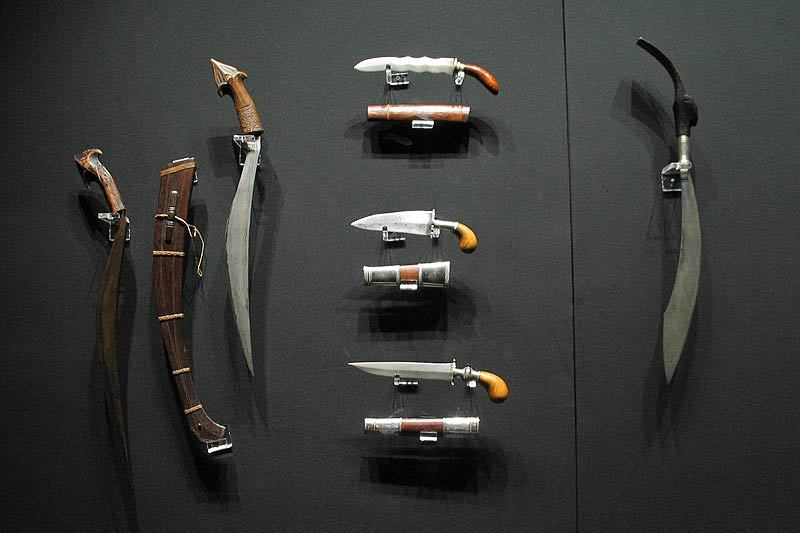
Examples of finely crafted Moro blades made from Basilan "basih" (iron).

Oral traditions of the local Yakan people include several names for pre-historic Basilan: "Uleyan", which is derived from the present-named Basilan Peak (Puno Mahaji), and later changed to "Matangal" after a mountain farther to the east of the island. These names were presumably used by the Maguindanao traders from mainland Mindanao, utilizing these mountains as navigational landmarks when sailing the Celebes Sea. Other names romantically given were "Puh Gulangan" or "island of forests", "Umus Tambun" or "fertile land", "Kumalarang" after the westward flowing river on the island's western half which is also otherwise called Baunuh Peggesan.

=== Taguima ===
Pre-Hispanic texts from the royal archives of the Sulu Sultanate referred to the northernmost island of the Sulu Archipelago as Taguima, from the Yakan who were called "Tagihamas" (people of the interior or hinterlands) by the Tausug and Samal peoples who came and settled in numerous but scattered communities along Basilan's western and southwestern shores and outlying islets and island groups.

Later references mentioned "Bantilan", probably referring to Maluso, which was established as a major Tausug base by Sulu Sultan Muizz ud-Din (whose princely name was Datu Bantilan).

Imperial Chinese texts mention a "Kingdom of Kumalarang" (from the Yakan "kumalang" or "to sing", owing to the location being a place for celebrations and gatherings) during the Ming Dynasty, believed to be the island which now has a barangay of the same name on its northwestern shores.

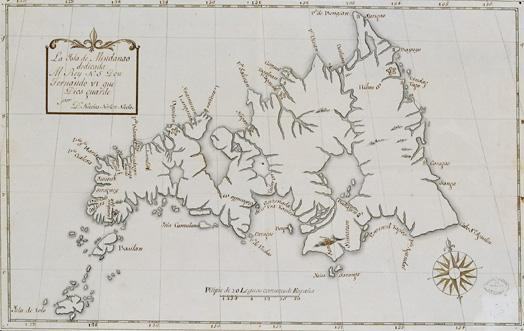
The first Spanish map of Mindanao officially naming "Basilan" island (instead of Taguima/Tagyma) by Nicolas Norton Nicols, published in 1757.

The earliest map of the Philippines which made reference to an island labeled "Taguima" was produced by Giacomo Gastaldi, through woodblock prints in 1548 and subsequently included in the influential travel book of Giovanni Battista Ramusio, the Della Navigatione e Viaggi, which was published between 1556 and 1583 in three volumes. This was followed by Abraham Ortelius's work Indiae Orientalis Insularumque Adiacientium Typus, published in 1573 in a German text edition of the atlas Theatrum Orbis Terrarum by Christophe Plantin in Antwerp. As late as 1719, a map titled "Die philippinische Inseln - Isle Brneo" by Allain Manesson Mallet of Frankfurt, Germany featured an island still labeled "Tagyma I."

=== Basilan ===
The process by which all these names became "Basilan" is almost certainly due to miscommunication between the natives and the Spanish, as well as the penchant to engage in editorial license by European map-makers of the era.

Basilan's name may also derive from its iron ore deposits. Tausug warriors and slave-traders from Sulu came to Taguima to purchase high-quality magnetic iron ores, which they used for swords, knives and other blades. This profitable trade, helped in large measure by the establishment of Maluso as a major military-naval base of the Sulu Sultanate, eventually gave the island the distinction of being the source of basih-balan, the Tausug word for magnetic iron. Roughly translated and abbreviated, however, basih-lan means "the iron (magnet) trail" or "the iron way".

When several Tausug warriors were caught by the Spanish in one of their numerous raids on the Zamboanga settlement, Spanish officials supposedly admired the artistry and skill that went into making the warriors' elaborately decorated swords, knives and blades, and asked where these weapons could be bought. From atop the ramparts of the Spanish commandery at the Fuerza del Nuestra Señora del Pilar de Zaragoza (Fort Pilar), the warriors supposedly pointed to the island visible across today's Basilan Strait, and said, simply, "ha basih-lan".

Reports from the Jesuit reducciones in Zamboanga and Pasangen (Isabela) were relayed to Manila, where Spanish cartographer Pedro Murillo de Velarde published Historia de la Provincia de Philipinas de la Compañia de Jesvs. Segvnda parte using the Jesuit printing press at Manila in 1749. It featured a map of the Philippines with the as yet unofficial "I. Basilan". The map was re-published by Leipzig map-maker Nicolaus Bellinn for general European circulation in 1752.

Finally, to represent a clear break from the Habsburg Dynasty (which had ruled Spain for 184 years from 1516 to 1700), the first officially sanctioned Spanish maps of its colonies, including "Las Islas de Mindanao", were commissioned by the Bourbons (1700–present). This particular map of Mindanao, apparently copied from the Nicolaus Bellinn map of 1752, was published by Nicolas Norton Nicols in 1757, featuring "Basilan" and bearing the royal stamp of Spanish Bourbon King Ferdinand VI. It has been called "Isla de Basilan" (Basilan Island) ever since.

=== Treasure Islands of the Southern Seas ===
Basilan Island's reputation as a staging-ground for piracy against Zamboanga, the Visayas and even Luzon, and as a temporary repository of the plunder from these raids. gave the island a notoriety not unlike the "Treasure Islands", buccaneers' havens and pirate coves of the Caribbean.

Spanish and Tausug fleets engaged each other in sea battles and skirmishes not far from the western shores of the islands. Many of their ships were scuttled or sunk, sometimes with precious cargoes of traded goods and Mexican silver pieces meant for the fort in Zamboanga and the naval squadron at Isabela, as well as goods en route to Jolo from the Mindanao mainland.

The Spanish Pigafetta expedition landed on a group of islets west of the main island of Basilan, where they found precious pearls; subsequent Spanish cartographers aptly named these the "Isletas de Perlas" (Pearl Islets). Native Samal and Bajao folk called this group of islets and reefs "Pilas" (Perlas), a name still used to this day. More recently, there have been local rumors about gold bars and other trinkets hidden among the many islets by retreating Japanese troops at the end of World War II. To date, treasure hunters of various nationalities, among them Japanese and Europeans, have scoured the area.

All these tales of treasures hidden in Basilan's many remote, unpopulated islets gave it the nickname "Treasure Islands of the Southern Seas", immortalized in the official anthem of the Province of Basilan, "Fair Basilan", composed by Basilan lyricist and composer Tranquilino Gregorio.

== Pre-Hispanic Taguima ==
Basilan's earliest settlers was traditionally believed to be the Orang Dampuans originating from the islands of Eastern Indonesia, who are supposed to be the ancestors of the native Yakans. They are variously called the Orang Dyaks or the Tagihamas.

The Yakans, an inland pagan tribe, inhabited the Sulu Archipelago together with the indigenous Sama and Bajau before the ethnically Visayan Tausug, originally from northeastern Mindanao, started migrating into the region from around the 11th to 13th century.

Historians have scant knowledge of the pre-Spanish history of the indigenous Yakans simply because they have had little contact with other ethnic groups. Basilan's nearness to Borneo led to the theory that the Yakan originated from the Dyak. Although it is fairly safe to say that Basilan's history is related to that of the Sulu archipelago, it is by no means right to suppose that Basilan's first inhabitants came from Indonesia.

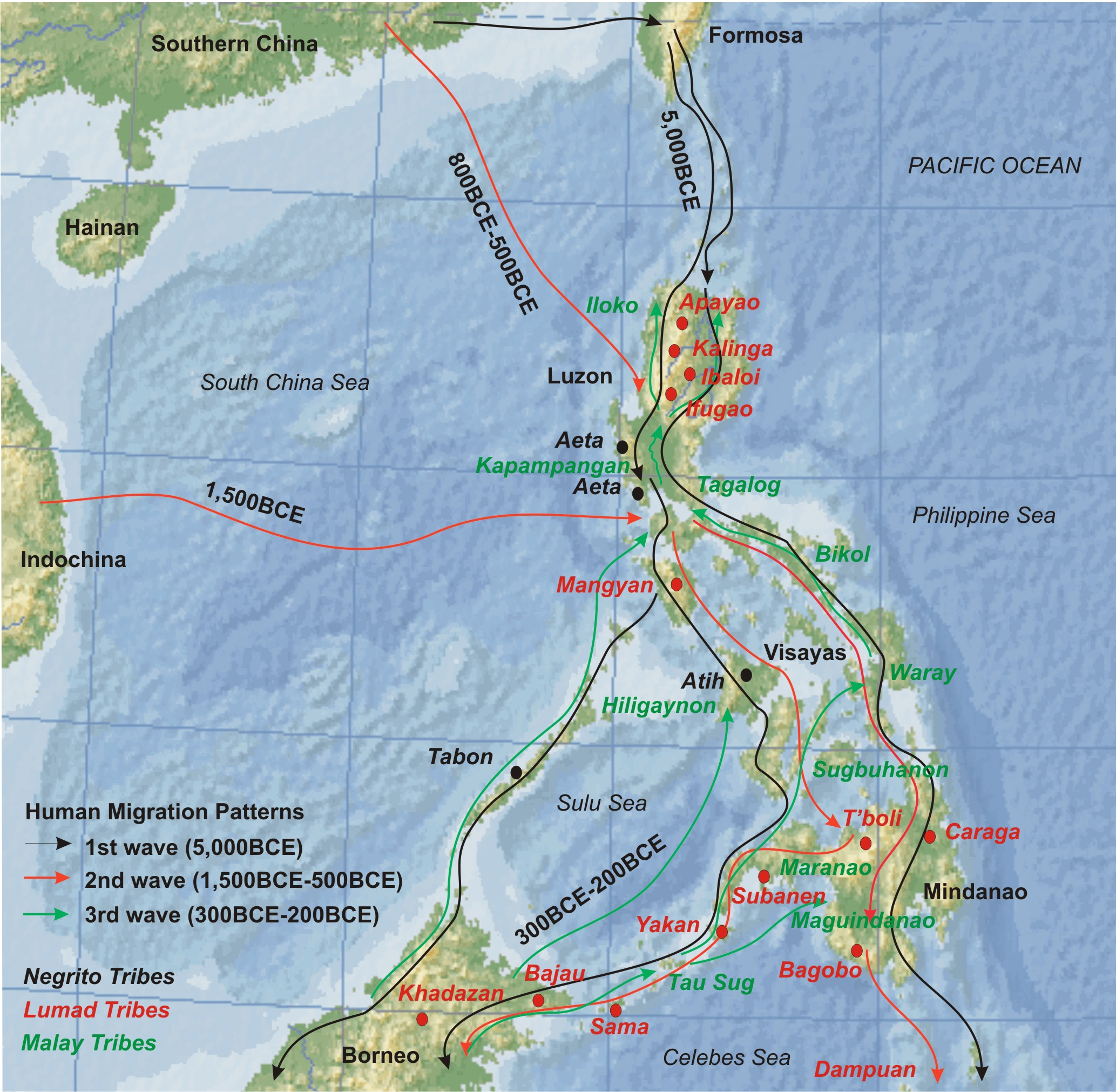

Recent anthropological and archaeological findings actually point to a reverse pattern of human migration and subsequent habitation. Originating from the region we know now as Southern China, some of the earliest human communities constituting the northernmost dark-skinned branches of the first or "southern" wave of human migrations from Africa, ancestors of modern-day Aetas and Negritos, were forced to leave the area in the wake of the arrival of the second wave of human migrants out of Africa, the "northern" wave or the ancestors of present-day Chinese aboriginal tribes. These short, dark-skinned and kinky-haired humans first found a home in the relatively isolated island of Taiwan.

At about 5,000BCE, just as Earth was about to exit its most recent ice age, a virtual explosion of human migration again ensued, this time from Taiwan, traveling via land-bridges to Luzon in the Philippines, and farther south. The first wave of these Austronesian migrants proceeded to populate the greater and lesser Sunda islands of Borneo, Sulawesi, the Moluccas, Java and Sumatra in Maritime Southeast Asia and make up the Malayo-Austronesian branch of this population grouping. A more recent sub-branch traveled across the Indian Ocean and populated the previously uninhabited island of Madagascar off the southeast coast of Africa. The second wave of Austronesians traveled eastwards from the Philippines, populating the Western Pacific islands of New Guinea (Papua), Melanesia, Micronesia and Polynesia.

Most of these negrito populations were eventually assimilated through inter-racial mingling with Thai-Khmer populations moving southwards from the Thai-Indochinese peninsula, the result being the Malayan race that now inhabit Malaysia, Indonesia (Nusantara), and the Philippines. The negrito populations of the western Pacific however, far removed from racial inter-mingling from the Asian mainland, eventually evolved into the present populations of New Guinea, Fiji, Hawaii and other Pacific island groups.

If Basilan itself was previously inhabited by these ancient Negrito peoples, they were eventually driven farther south by the arrival at around 1500BCE-500BCE of the same ancient Chinese-Annamese aboriginals who drove away the Negritos from Southern China in the first place. Philippine historians from the Spanish-era mistakenly called these new arrivals "Indones" (Indian islanders) exhibiting physical features closer to the ancient Chinese and Annamese. The lighter-skinned and relatively slimmer and taller "Indones" communities eventually became the ancestors of modern-day indigenous Philippine tribes populating nearly the entire Philippine archipelago, the modern-day Lumads of the Philippines, and it is likewise believed that the Yakans were descended from this same population grouping.

The general migratory pattern therefore of the original inhabitants of the Philippine Archipelago follows a north–south path, contrary to widely held beliefs based primarily on the more recent cultural counter-migration which started from 300–200BCE.

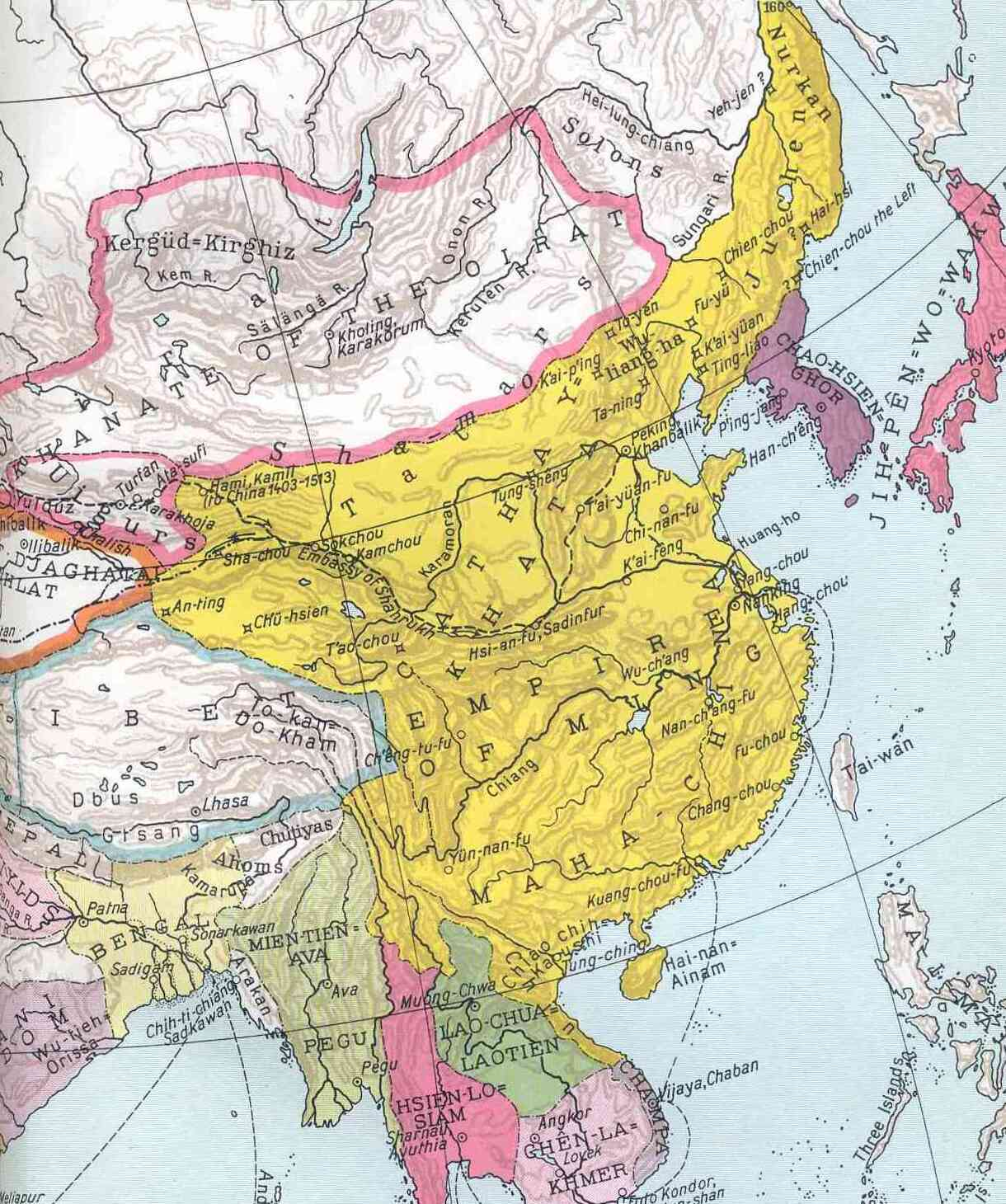
Map of East Asia during China's Ming Dynasty

This third and final wave of human migration came from the general direction of Maritime Southeast Asia, albeit this time by full-fledged Malays (from Borneo) who then promptly displaced indigenous tribes from their coastal communities, driving the Indones or the Lumads farther inland, or south and east into the eastern Indonesian islands. This particular migratory pattern is seen in the pre-Hispanic legends of the 10 Datus from Borneo colonizing the island of Panay, where a much older "Ati" (Aeta or Negrito) kingdom graciously met them at their arrival. The migration of Malays into the Philippines was accelerated by the development of the ancient thalassocratic empires of the Malayo-Indian Sri Vijaya (from whom the name of the Visayas islands are derived) and the Javanese Majapahit in the 12th–14th centuries.

Two main branches of this Malay invasion entered the Philippine Archipelago via two separate routes. One, believed to have originated from Sumatra and the Malay Peninsula, passed via the northern coast of Borneo, and through Palawan and eventually settled by the banks of the river Pasig in Luzon. These settlers soon branched into two tribes, the first became known as the "people of the river" (or 'taga-ilog'/ Tagalog), which developed a more sedentary, agricultural society built on the fertile plains fed by the Pasig and around the area of Laguna Lake; while the second hugged the shores of Manila Bay and therefore called the "people of the coast" ('ka-pampang-an'/ Pampanga), primarily engaged in fishing. Kapampangans eventually moved northwards into the interior of Luzon, and, inter-marrying with indigenous 'highlanders' and visiting Chinese traders, eventually produced the Iloko tribe. Tagalogs on the other hand, moved further into the southeastern peninsula of Luzon, meeting up with the indigenous communities there, as well as the "sea peoples of Visayas and Mindanao". This produced the Bikol tribe.

The second and more recent main branch of Malays, believed to come from Java and the Banjarmasin kingdom of southern Borneo, came by way of the Sulu Archipelago, into Mindanao and up into the Visayas. These "sea peoples" (so-called because they arrived to colonize the islands in their various sea crafts, i.e. balotos, tilibaos, balasias, balangais, vireys, paraos and caracoas), eventually branched further into two tribes: the Tau-Sug, which settled in the Sulu Archipelago; and the Sug-bu-hanon which proceeded to colonize Cebu (Sug-bo). A variety of intermingling between these two main tribes, as well as indigenous tribes and aetas (as in the case of Iloilo and the 10 Datus of Borneo), produced a plethora of other smaller tribes, i.e. Hiligaynon, Waray in the Visayas, and the Maguindanao, Maranaw in Mindanao.

The Ifugao (of the Mountain Provinces) and the Cuyunon (Palawan), Mangyan (Mindoro) tribes are indigenous survivors of the northern branch invasion. On the other hand, the Subanen (Zamboanga), Caraga (Agusan/Surigao), Manobo (Cotabato), Higaonon (Lanao/Misamis), Sama/Bajau (Sulu/Tawi-Tawi), and Yakan (Basilan) survived the southern branch invasion.

This pattern of initial habitation and subsequent displacement by newer arrivals is clearly seen in the case of Basilan, where the slim, tall, aquiline-nosed, and slit-eyed Lumad (Yakan) communities were driven far inland and towards the eastern and northeastern coasts of the island by the shorter, stockier and darker-skinned Malays (Tausugs) who proceeded to occupy the island's western and northwestern coasts. (The same pattern was repeated at the arrival of the Spanish and the Christian Malay "Indios" from the Visayas and Luzon who were considerably taller and lighter-skinned than the Muslim Malay "Moros", removing the latter to the island's southeast enclave that they now dominate.)

Because the Philippine archipelago was successively populated by two waves of negrito and ancient Chinese peoples before the rest of Maritime Southeast Asia and the western Pacific were, it is widely presumed that instead of the Yakans having descended from eastern Indonesian Dyaks, the more logical conclusion would be that these eastern Indonesian Dyaks were remnants of the "Indones" tribes fleeing from the Malays, some of whom may even have been descended from the Yakan themselves.

=== Yakan Karajaan of Kumalarang ===
Records of pre-Hispanic Philippines gleaned from the extensive archives of China's Imperial courts mentions a Kingdom of Kumalarang located in one of the southern islands of Mayi (the Chinese name for the Philippine archipelago), whose King sent regular tribute to the Chinese emperor through Chinese traders who frequented the place in the 13th to 14th centuries. Local historians attribute this long lost kingdom to modern-day Kumalarang (now reduced to a Barangay) located along the northwestern coast of Basilan island.

Specifically, according to the Collected Statutes of the Ming Dynasty, a report gleaned from the records of Dezhou, Shandong, China (archived and researched in the years 1673, 1788 and 1935): 3 months after the death of Paduka Batara (the Samalan potentate who visited the Chinese Emperor Yongle and died on October 23, 1417), a High Court Mandarin, Zhan Jian, was ordered to sail to Kumalarang (Chinese texts refer to "Kumalalang"), a vassal state of the Sulu Sultanate located on the northwestern coast of Taguima (Basilan Is.).

Zhan Jian was received by Ipentun (Ch. ref. "Kanlai Ipentun"), presumably a Yakan Prince, who ruled the Kingdom as a vassal to the Sultan of Sulu. The Mandarin official stayed in Kumalarang for 2 years before returning to China.

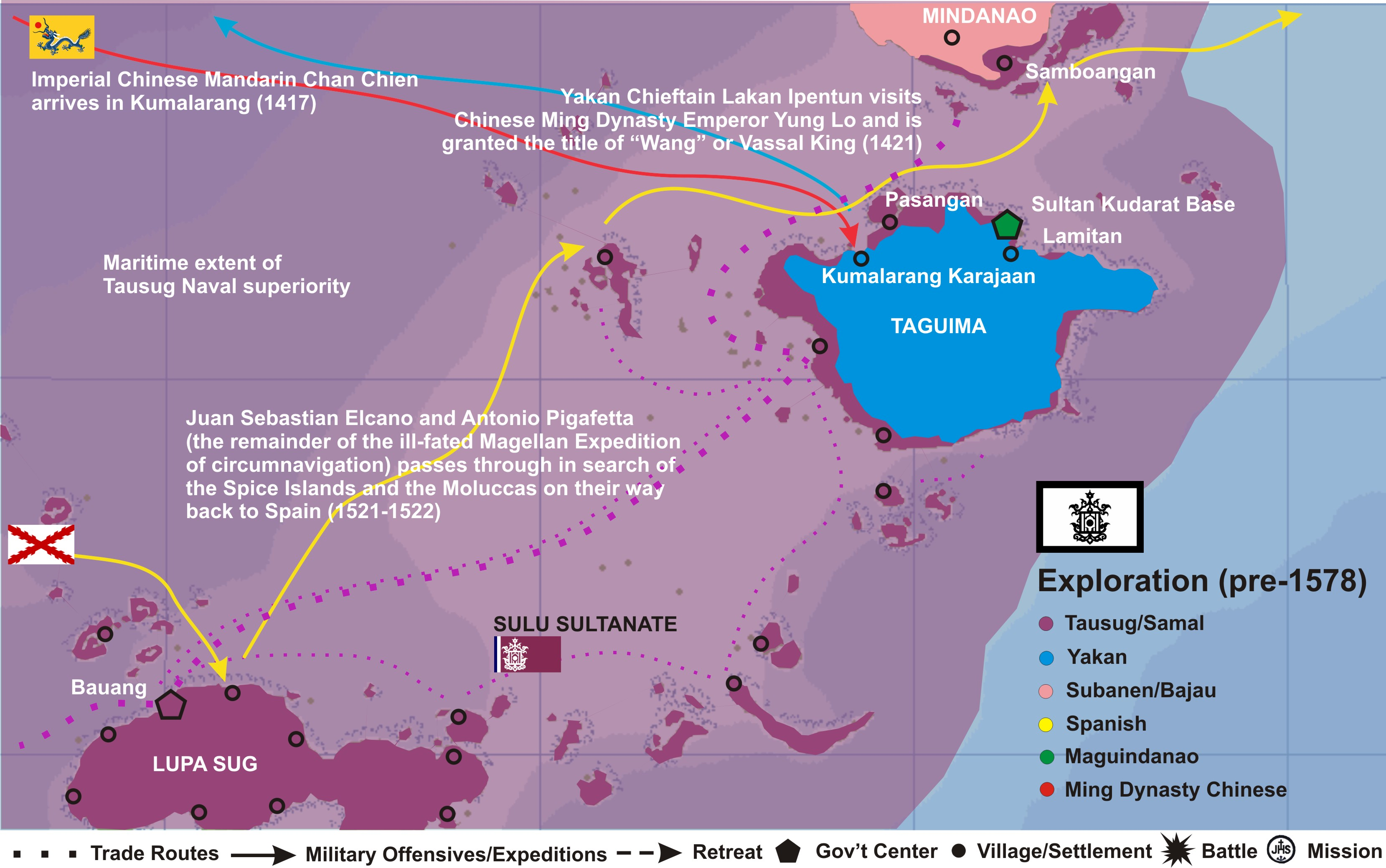

He was accompanied by Ipentun and an entourage of several hundred, composed of his immediate family, minor chieftains (datus), and servants. They were finally given an audience with the Chinese Emperor on November 16, 1420, where he formally asked the latter to proclaim him as a recognized sovereign and vassal to the Dragon Throne.

Ipentun wrote a missive to the Chinese Emperor on December 28, 1420, complaining about the time it took for the Chinese Emperor to act on his request. The Chinese Emperor received the petition and finally granted Ipentun with the title of "wang" (king). After his request was granted, a satisfied Ipentun, along with his entire retinue, started for home.

On May 27, 1421, however, unaccustomed to the cold climate of the preceding winter and due to his advancing age, Ipentun died in Fujian, China, just as they were about to embark on Chinese junks that would have brought them home. His funeral was supervised by Yang Shan, administrator of the temples, and was likewise honored by a eulogy sent by the Chinese Emperor which extolled his virtues of "determination and serenity". His son, Lapi, was then proclaimed as rightful successor to the just bestowed title of "wang". Lapi sent one of his father's most trusted officials, Batikisan, to petition for an audience with the Chinese Emperor where he presented a "memorial" in gold plaque on November 3, 1424.

The party, with its newly proclaimed King, eventually returned to Kumalarang, and almost just as promptly faded from the historical records of the period.

== Spanish era ==
The first Europeans to ever document Basilan were the remainder of the ill-fated Ferdinand Magellan expedition, led by Juan Sebastián Elcano, and extensively documented by Italian scholar Antonio Pigafetta in the later part of 1521. Fresh from the debacle in Mactan, and after having their numbers reduced from 254 to less than a hundred scurvy-ridden sailors, the Spanish party scoured the area of the Sulu Archipelago for a route to the Moluccas (Spice Islands). After passing reefs and bountiful seaweeds, they came to an archipelago, the main islands Pigafetta recorded as "the islands of Zolo and Taghima (Sulu and Basilan) near which pearls are found". Food and water were difficult to come by in this episode of their voyage, however, so they eventually returned to Mindanao. The expedition eventually found its way to the Moluccas and then finally returned to Spain. They were the first Europeans to circumnavigate the world. Only 18 of them survived the long voyage and made it back to Spain.

Upon the return of Adelantado Miguel López de Legazpi from New Spain in 1565, and the establishment of the Spanish colonial government first in Cebu, then in Iloilo and finally in Manila, the island of Basilan was gradually colonized and settled, inducted as a Spanish possession as early as 1636, formally organized as the 6th District of the Police-Military Government of Mindanao by 1860, and completely pacified by 1886 - a period spanning exactly 250 years.

In September 1581, Msgr. Domingo de Salazar, O.P., the first bishop of the islands, arrived in Manila. It was during his time and on his initiative that an assembly of sorts was convened in 1582 on the lines of a council, "to deal with matters concerning the furthering of the Faith and the justification of past and future conquests by Spain".

The fathers of the council were of the opinion that no valid claim could be laid to the conquest of the Philippines other than that based on the right to preach the gospel, with the qualifying clauses, mentioned above. But for this right to justify possession of territories, it was unnecessary to depend on any direct opposition of the natives to the preaching of the gospel, since the inferior or primitive organization of their government and of their laws as would hinder or thwart their conversion was, in itself, sufficient reason.

Standard of the Spanish Empire's explorers and conquistadors, eventually becoming the flag of New Spain.

This theory of the Council of 1582 was unanimously accepted by the religious of the Philippines, including Bishop Salazar.

Stemming from this Council's resolutions, real Spanish authority spread over the islands hinged on the theory of "voluntary submission" or "free consent" from the natives. Such a consensual contract was institutionalized in the "cedula" imposed by the Spanish government on all its subjects in the islands.

There is also the free consent given in 1845 by the different chieftains of Basilan Island in Mindanao, who were contacted by the governor of Zamboanga upon instructions to that effect given him by the then Governor-General Narciso de Claveria. This free consent was construed as having been represented by the issuance of "cedulas" to residents of Basilan.

It is noteworthy though, that in a later communication to the central government in Spain, Governor Claveria corrected the earlier erroneous information that Dato Usuk and the people of the Maluso region, in the said island had given their consent. Governor Claveria made it clear that such had not been the case, so the government was to refrain from exercising any sovereignty over them. Such was the scrupulousness with which this matter of free consent was regarded by Spain. Even as late as 1881 the same criterion would be followed by the Spanish government.

=== Colonization & the Jesuit "reducciones" ===
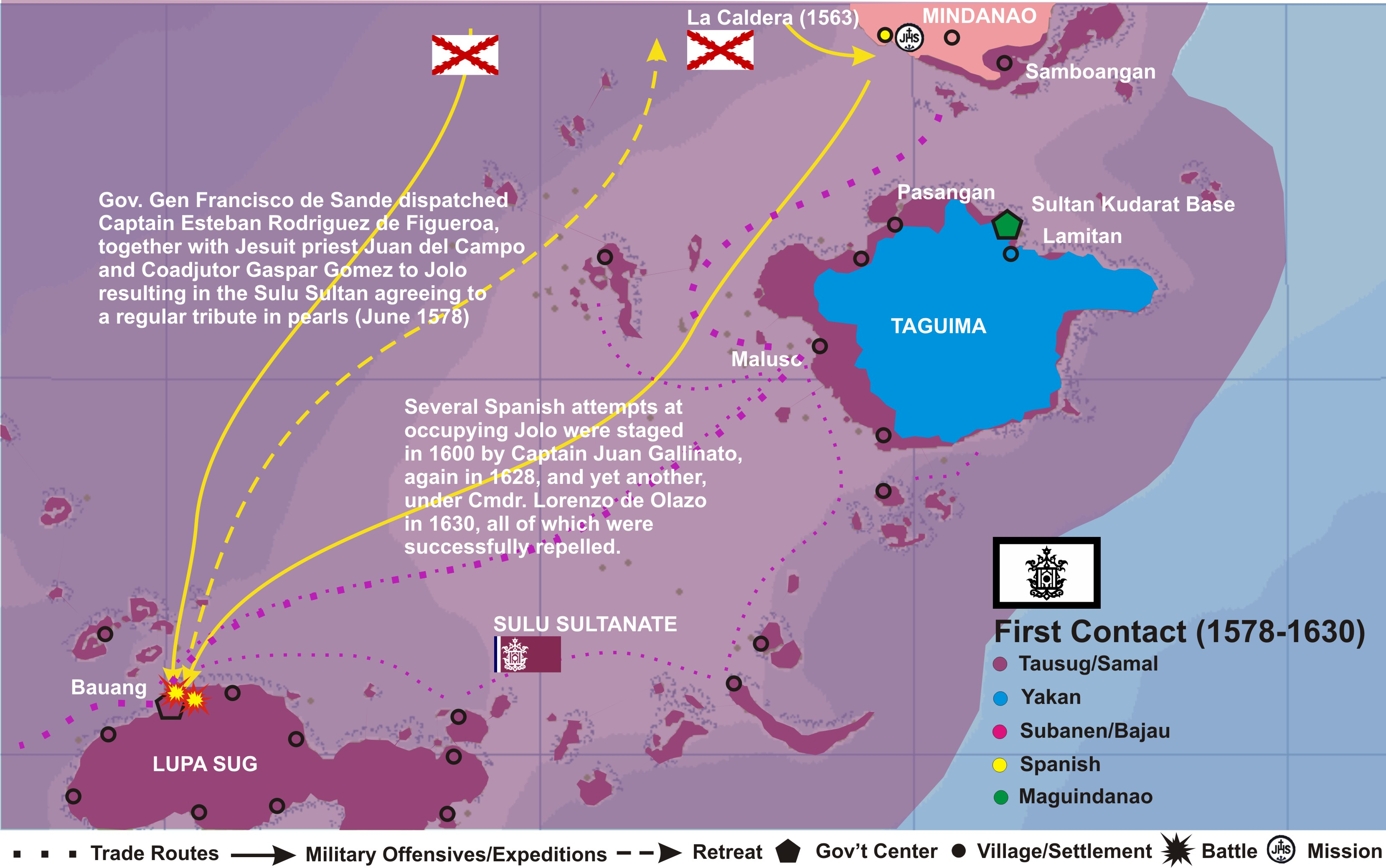

The legendary Sultan Kudarat (Qachil Corralat to the Spanish) of Maguindanao maintained lucrative trade routes between his mainland kingdom and the Sulu Archipelago through a base situated in Lamitan. The Maguindanaos then called the island "Matangal" after the highest visible peak from the Celebes Sea. This base served as a staging ground for much of Sultan Kudarat's offensives against the Spanish until the Spaniards under the command of Governor General Sebastián Hurtado de Corcuera crushed it in 1637, just one year after the Spanish Fort in nearby Zamboanga was established. Spanish reports of the battle listed an Apuh Menggah, and Apuh Dagang and Apuh Batalan as the main Yakan Chieftains leading the local resistance at that time, all of whom were roundly defeated, prompting a significant number of their followers to move farther inland and southwards.

The proselytization of Basilan started in earnest, however, when Fr. Francisco Lado, a Jesuit, established the first Catholic mission, in an area called Pasangen by the native Yakans. "Pasangen" is a Yakan term for "commune", "town" or "a place where people visit or stay". This coastal area, however, was already predominantly populated by Tausug and Samal settlers when the Spanish came, and therefore was likewise locally called a "pagpasalan" or "settlement area". The Jesuit missionaries from Zamboanga arrived on the same year that the removal of Sultan Kudarat's base from Lamitan was effected, and established themselves in Pasangen on the island's northwestern coast. They constructed the first wooden mission and palisade wall near the mouth of the Aguada River, and dedicated the Island to St. Ignatius of Loyola, the founder of the Jesuit order.

Pasangen then was ruled by three Tausug Chieftains, i.e., Datu Ondol, Datu Boto and Datu Kindingan. Through the efforts of the early missionaries, supported by Don Pedro Palomino of the Zamboanga settlement, all three were persuaded to be converted to Catholicism, with the last having been baptized Luis Quindingan - the first Christian Basileño and anointed head of the local principalía.

The Spaniards made several attempts to control Jolo, but failed to do so until 1876. Basilan, however, was a wholly different story. Catholic missionaries together with Spanish soldiers who inter-married into the native population were able to successfully penetrate Basilan. So much so that by 1654 there were about 1,000 Christian families living in the island. Foremost among these pioneering families is the extended Lazaro Clan who, together with its cadet branches, the Saavedra, Generalao, Suson, Pardo, Barrios and Guevarra families, owned most of the cultivated lands that was to form part of the growing Christian settlement.

Thus, the veil of Catholicism began to slowly spread across the island with the spirited drive of the militant Jesuits. With no spices or gold to enrich the Spanish king's coffers, except for local taxes, the Jesuits refocused the Spanish government's agenda and made religion the object of their expansion and conquest here.

In anticipation of an invasion from the Chinese pirate-warlord Koxinga, that was expected to devastate Manila, the Spanish authorities withdrew all stations in the south of the country to augment their forces holed up in Intramuros, temporarily freeing Zamboanga and Isabela from direct Spanish administration in 1663.

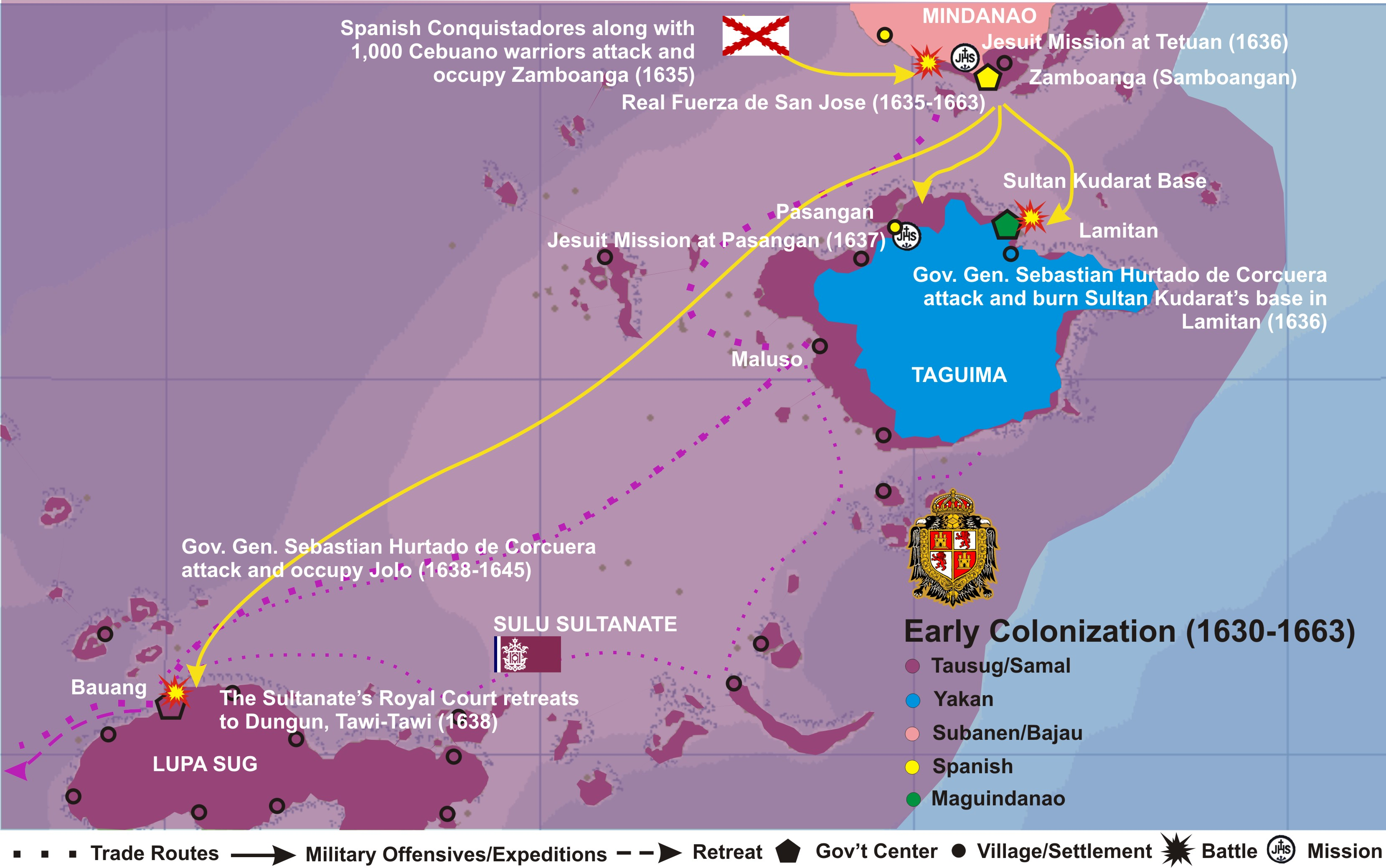

Governor Sabiniano Manrique de Lara signed a decree on May 6, 1662, ordering the military evacuation of the fort in Zamboanga, and of other Spanish colonies, including that of Ternate in the spice islands of the Moluccas. Upon receipt of these orders on June 17, 1662, the Spanish garrisons, along with a number of priests and their chosen local people started preparations for the eventual evacuation. The garrison were given orders to abandon the fort to the Christian Samas (progenitors of modern-day Chavacanos). Such a move was vigorously opposed by the Jesuits, though, particularly by Rev. Francisco Combes, SJ, even then, an acknowledged historian of Mindanao, but to no avail. The Zamboanga fort was finally abandoned sometime in April 1663 by the last remaining Spanish troops, they were evacuated and returned to Cavite to help defend Manila's Intramuros from a threatened invasion by Chinese pirate Koxinga, which never happened.

As fate will have it, the Chavacanos of Zamboanga and Pasangen, Jesuits included, will endure another 56 years (1662–1718) of isolated existence and proliferation amidst the hostile threat and return of the Moro Pirates who overtook and destroyed the abandoned fort. In the face of renewed threats from the surrounding Moro kingdoms of the area, the beleaguered Christian native population of 6,000 including a number of Jesuit priests, moved their settlement farther inland towards the area of modern-day Tetuan, where a Jesuit mission dedicated to Saint Ignatius was built. The Jesuit mission in Basilan, too, held out, albeit having its population drastically reduced by the seemingly endless onslaught by hostile neighbors.

The Jesuits, belonging to the aggressive religious expansionists' Society of Jesus, who remained in Zamboanga were historically credited for petitioning Madrid for the reconstruction of the damaged fort in 1666, three years after the last Spanish soldiers vacated their walled post. Spanish Queen Regent Maria Anna issued a cedula to the effect, but orders were not carried out by the authorities in Manila. A second order to re-establish the Fort was issued in 1672, but Gov. Diego de Salcedo again failed to carry this out as well.

In the absence of Spanish Royal authorities the Jesuits formed a sort of Christian city-state, called "reductions" (Spanish Reducciones, Portuguese Reduções) in and around their 3-decade old Presidios both in Zamboanga and Basilan. These were societies set up according to an idealized theocratic model. The same type of communities were likewise established by the Jesuits throughout South America, but especially in present-day Brazil and Paraguay. The abandoned "reduccion" of some 1,000 Christian converts on the island of Basilan was thus placed under the leadership of Luis Quindingan, designated as Camp Marshal and Chief by the retreating Spanish garrison.

Although Koxinga died about a year after his veiled threat to invade Manila, which caused the recall of Spanish troops to defend it, there was no formal reason given as to why the Spanish government refrained from returning their troops to Zamboanga soon after.

On January 17, 1673, an English freebooter, Capt. William Dampier reached Tictabun island off the Zamboanga coast. There he wrote down this account: "A little to the westward of the Keys (Tictabun island) we saw an abundance of coconut trees, therefore we sent our canoes, thinking to find inhabitants, but found none, no sign of any, but great tracks of wild hogs and great cattle, and close by the sea were ruins of an old fort. The walls thereof are of good height, built with stone and lime, and by the workmanship seemed to be Spaniard."

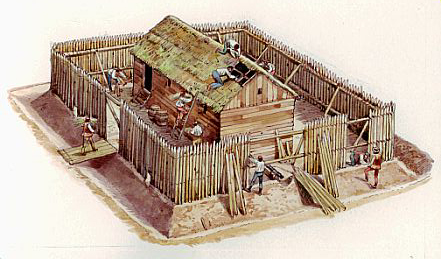
Illustration of the Spanish palisade fortification and Jesuit mission constructed at Pasangen, on the northwestern coast of Taguima

The year 1718 will change it all.

The Spanish royal authorities eventually returned in 1718. Both the Tetuan and Basilan missions, however, held out against all odds. Despite incessant attacks and raids by the Moros, the surviving Christian populations of both missions still numbered over 3,000 by the time the Spanish returned.

After having re-established lucrative trading agreements with the native kingdoms that dotted the area, nearby Zamboanga experienced a revival in its economy. The increasingly wealthy Spanish trading post in Zamboanga became an even more sought after prize for the Moro pirates of the era, so much so that the surrounding islands started to attract the attention of other foreign powers, and chief among these coveted islands was Basilan.

Hostilities resumed in the 18th century, and this was triggered by the decision in 1718 by Gov. Gen Juan Antonio dela Torre Bustamante to reconstruct Real Fuerza de San José in Bagumbayan, Zamboanga. The fort completed in 1719 was renamed Real Fuerza del Pilar de Zaragosa (Fort Pilar is its popular name today). The rebuilt fort was inaugurated on 16 April by Don Fernando Bustillos Bustamante Rueda, senior maestro de campo of Zamboanga. Three years later in 1722, the Spaniards were launching another expedition against Jolo. Led by Andres Garcia, the expedition failed miserably.

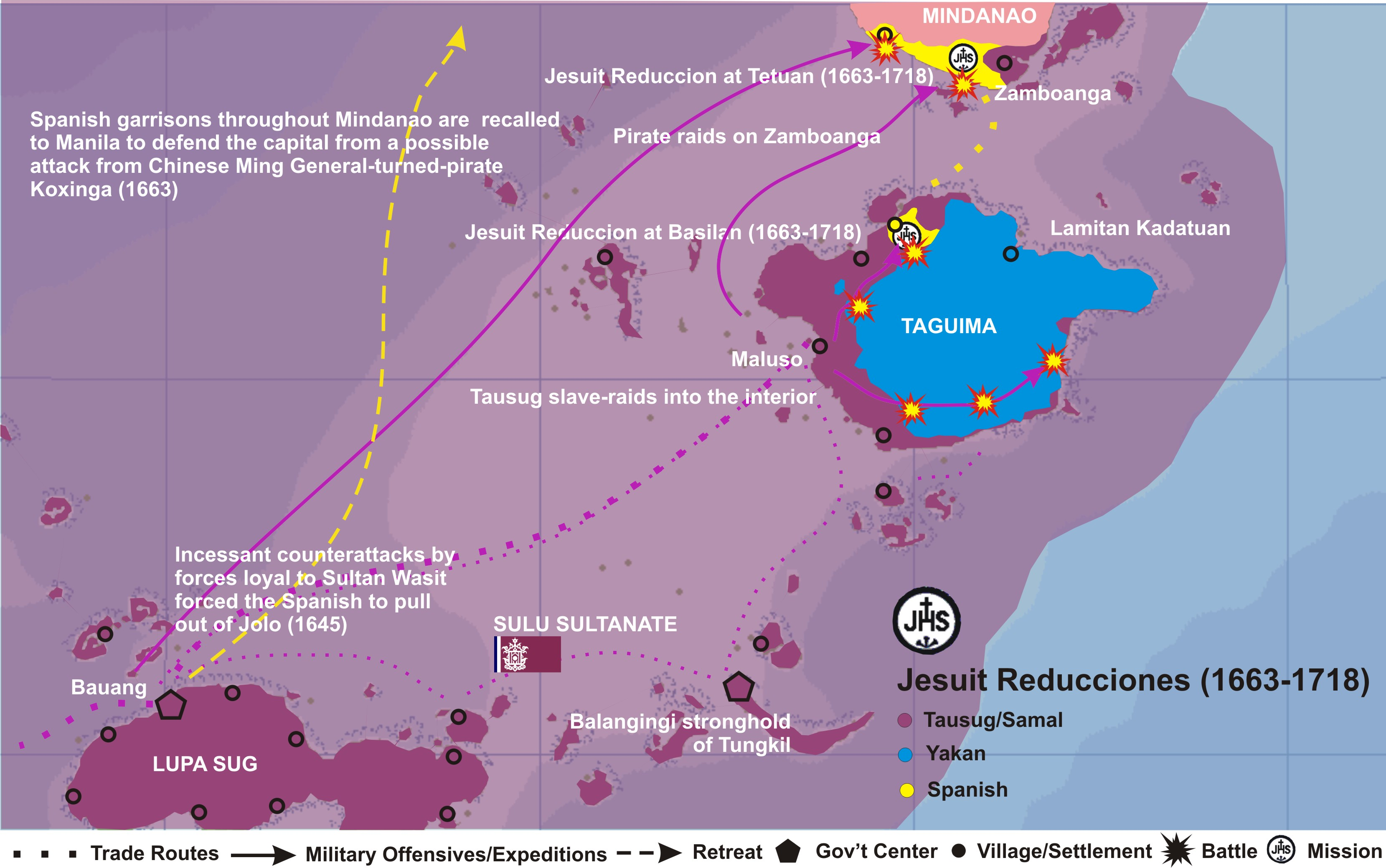

By then, Badar ud-Din, Sultan of Sulu, wo was keenly interested in developing commercial ties with Manila and China, approached the Spanish with a proposal of peace. According to the agreement they arrived at in 1726, the Spanish and Sulu were permitted to trade freely with each other and the Island of Basilan was ceded to Spain. However, in a series of raids on the Visayas, subjects of the Sultan broke the treaty which resulted in the renewal of large-scale hostilities by 1730. In 1731, General Ignacio Iriberri lead a force of 1000 to Jolo and captured it after a lengthy siege. But the Spaniards left after a few days.

In order to strengthen the Spanish position in Zamboanga and the neighboring regions, three companies of native volunteers were organized in 1832. These natives together with the Spanish troops defended the town and the province from the sporadic attack by the Moros.

In a slew of misnomers, the Spaniards mistakenly referred to the Sultan of Sulu's subjects as Moros (Spanish for "Moors"). The word Moor was derived from the ancient "Mauri/Maure" tribe of North Africa, found in the ancient Roman Provinces of Mauretania Tingitana and Mauretania Caesariensis. Today, the descendants of the Mauri/Maure - the Berbers - continue to occupy the northwestern coasts of Africa, and are spread throughout the countries of Morocco, western Algeria, and Mauritania, all of which are North African countries just across the narrow western end of the Mediterranean Sea from Spain, and peopled by Muslims which conquered and ruled Spain for 800 years. This explains the seemingly natural animosity felt by the Spanish against the Muslim natives in these islands, especially coming from a victorious war against Muslims for the reconquest ("Reconquista") of the Iberian Peninsula from the Almohads and the Taifa Kingdoms which lasted for centuries.

On the other hand, due primarily to their decidedly Hindu-Buddhist influenced societies - having been long-time vassals of the thalassocratic Hindu-Buddhist Sri Vijaya Empire - the non-Muslim native tribes were then referred to by the Spanish as "Indios" (Spanish for Indians), and called their colony in the far east, Las Indias Orientales Españolas (or the "Spanish East Indies").

Half of the Zamboanga peninsula was made into a Corregimiento (district) de Zamboanga with its jurisdiction reaching as far as Sindangan to the north and the whole of Basilan island to the south, while the northern half of the peninsula belonged to the District of Misamis. In 1837, the government was changed to a Gobierno Militar. Zamboanga was made the capital of Mindanao throughout the Spanish regime, except the period between 1872 and 1875, when the government was at Cottabato.

=== Jesuit expulsion ===
Towards the second part of the 18th century, pirate raids from Sulu increasingly harassed the Spanish settlement in nearby Zamboanga, usually using their heavily fortified base in Maluso as a staging ground for some of their more successful forays. The Tausug raids reached a fevered intensity by 1754. By this time, a flourishing kingdom of Yakans and Samals was established in the area of modern-day Lamitan City. Headed by a loose confederation of Datus (local tribal chieftains), called a Kadatuan, the Yakan Confederacy traded with the Yakan communities farther inland.

In the meantime, the Jesuits were expelled from Portugal, France, the Two Sicilies, Parma and the Spanish Empire in 1768. Jesuit missions were very controversial in Europe, especially in Spain and Portugal, where they were seen as interfering with the proper colonial enterprises of the royal governments. The Jesuits were often the only force standing between the natives and slavery. It is partly because the Jesuits protected the natives whom certain Spanish and Portuguese colonizers wanted to enslave that the Society of Jesus was eventually suppressed. The Recoletos de San Jose (Recollects) took over territories previously assigned to the Jesuits.

In 1755, contingent of 1,900 men led by captains Simeon Valdez and Pedro Gastambide was sent to Jolo to avenge for the raids by Sultan Muiz ud-Din. But were roundly defeated. In 1775, after Moro raid on Zamboanga, Capitan Vargas led a punitive expedition against Jolo but was repulsed.

Throughout this brief period, however, Catholic missionaries continued their avid proselytization, converting entire clans of Subanen, Samals, Yakans and Tausugs to Catholicism, adding to the growing Visayan populations brought in primarily from Cebu and Panay.

=== Tausug Karajaan of Maluso ===
Royal Flag of the Sultanate of Sulu

Historical records about Basilan shifted then to the archives found in the Royal courts of the maritime power that is right next door - the Sulu Sultanate.

The sultanate of Sulu became a center of power in the 18th century, ruled over the island of Basilan nominally, and had little influence over the Yakan who were gradually driven far into the island's interior (Sherfan 1976:11; Haylaya 1980:43).

It is widely assumed that by this time, Kumalarang has either ceased to exist as a kingdom or was eventually broken up and its Yakan inhabitants forced to migrate en masse towards the hinterlands. The Yakans, having retreated from any considerable direct contact with the invading Tausugs, have retained their ancient animist beliefs in large measure, only embracing Islam at a much later date.

Islam is said to have started in the Philippines in 1380 but some scholars believe that Islam spread in some areas of the archipelago during the early 13th century. Then and now, the inhabitants of the Sulu archipelago have been described as Muslims who have retained much of their pre-Islamic beliefs. Such folk-Islamic culture resulted from the fact that Islamic conversions were mostly undertaken not by full-time religious teachers but by Arab Muslim traders who traversed the Malacca–Borneo–Sulu–Luzon–Formosa route (Sherfan 1976: 12–13).

By the early 18th century, the Sultan of Sulu had defeated the Sultan of Maguindanao, signaling the rise of the Sulu sultanate in southern Philippines, with Jolo as the seat of power. Some Yakan villages sent a yearly tribute to the Sultan.

The Royal Archives of the Sulu Sultanate record that Sultan Azim ud-Din I, son of Badar ud-Din, and who was known to the Spaniards and most Tausugs as Alimuddin, ruled from 1735 to 1748. He was dethroned, exiled, then returned as Sultan from 1764 to 1774. His father proclaimed him ruler of Tawi-Tawi in 1735. In 1736, in a bid to cement the Sultanate's control over the busy trade routes that criss-crossed the area, the new Sultan decided to return his court from Dungun (Tawi-Tawi) to the old capital at Bauang (Jolo), which was abandoned in 1638 when the Spanish armada under Gov. Gen. Sebastian Hurtado de Corcuera attacked and occupied it until 1645.

However, distance from the powerful Datus at the court in Tawi-Tawi made relations between them more and more tenuous. These Datus grew increasingly hostile to Azim ud-Din I as the years progressed, having been seen as a friend of the Spanish. They hatched a plot that would eventually lead to Azim ud-Din's removal as Sultan in favor of his younger brother, who was known to Spanish officials and missionary priests as Pangiran Bantilan or Datu Bantilan. In 1748, Sultan Azim ud-Din was forced to leave Jolo for Taguima and then Zamboanga. His younger brother, famed and respected for repulsing a Dutch invading force in 1747, having been conferred his Royal name Muizz ud-Din, was then proclaimed sultan.

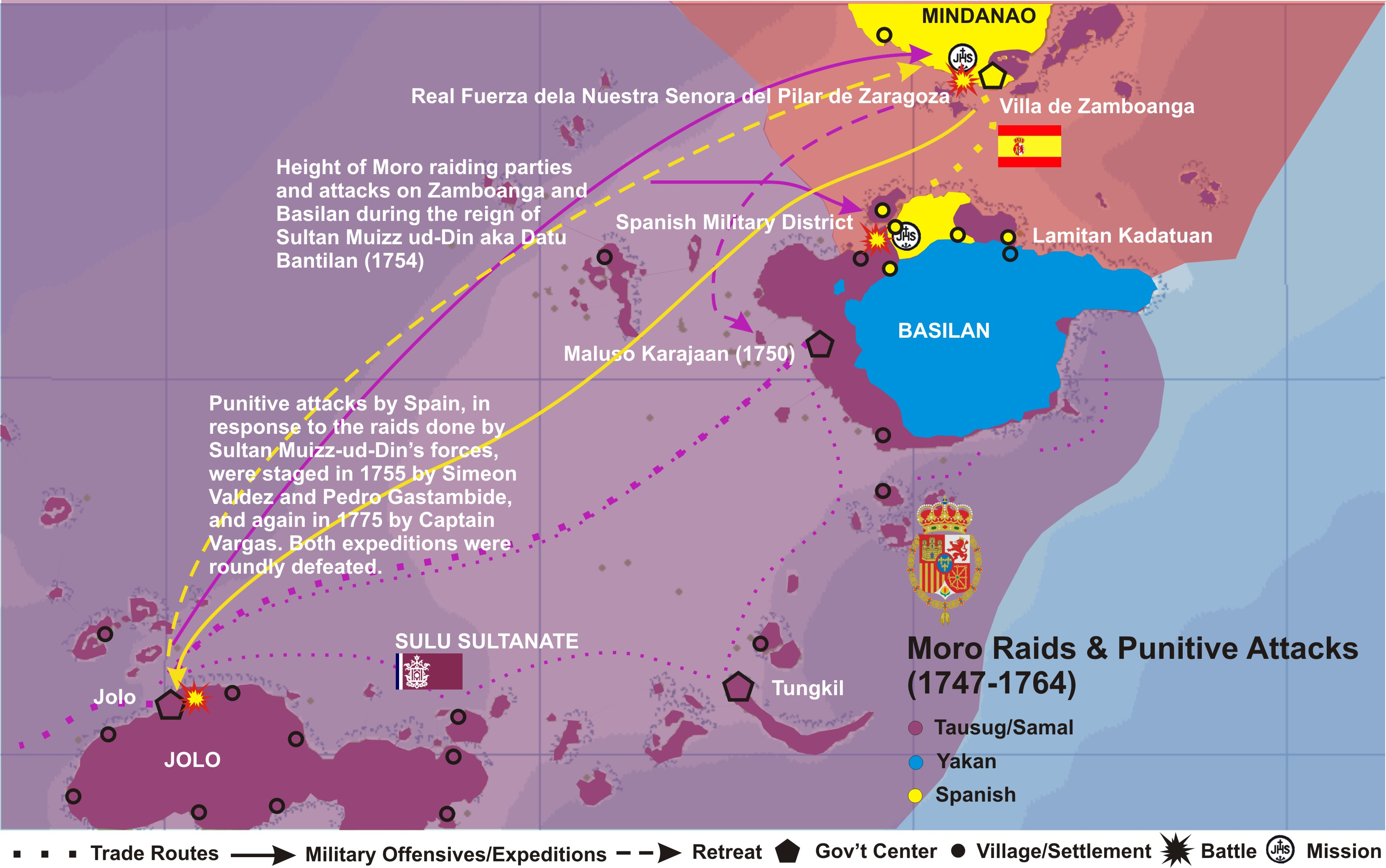

Still a strapping youth when he became a Sultan, Datu Bantilan ruled the Sultanate of Sulu for sixteen (16) violent though productive years (1748–1764), having vigorously promoted trade that linked Bauang (Jolo) with major trading ports straddling the Sulu Sea. He likewise launched several raids on the Spanish settlements in Zamboanga and the Visayas islands of Panay and Negros, and greatly profited from the slave-trade of captives taken from these raids which reached a fevered-pitch by 1754. He likewise repelled a Spanish attack consisting of some 1,900 soldiers sailing from Zamboanga.

In the meantime, Azim ud-Din, fearful that his enemies might seek him out even in exile, sailed off to Manila where he remained for sometime, relatively out of reach from his brother's lieutenants. His Manila sojourn included a few years of imprisonment at Fort Santiago, as well as an unconfirmed conversion to Catholicism.

To further strengthen his naval superiority in the Sulu Sea, several Tausug warriors were sent to establish a base on the northernmost island of the Sulu Archipelago, which until then was called Taguima, after the Tagihamas (descended from the Orang Dyaks and ancestors of the modern-day Yakans who are the acknowledged natives of the place). This base was built on the island's southwestern coast facing Sulu, an area already thickly populated by Tausug traders and fisherfolk. Maluso as it was called then, and is so to this day, was the same site where the young Datu Bantilan met and vanquished the Dutch, and razed their encampment at Port Holland, one year before he became Sultan.

This Tausug base became a vital jump-off point for raids on Zamboanga. As a major military naval base, Maluso was staffed with some of Sulu's best blade-smiths and boat-builders to see to it that the Sultan's raiders were properly equipped before any raid was launched. Slave-raids into the island's interior likewise commenced.

As these raids became more and more frequent, the native Yakans retreated farther and farther inland, away from the coasts which were periodically harried by Datu Bantilan's Tausug warriors and slave-raiders. The biggest and most advanced Yakan coastal settlement was located on the northeastern shores of Basilan, in Lamitan, and far from the usual routes of pirate raiders on their way to Zamboanga from Sulu and Maluso. The Yakans were understandably wary of the Tausugs who proceeded to occupy much of the lowlands of the island's southeast coast, and have remained hostile to the Tausug kingdom that eventually flourished in the area.

After several successful incursions on Zamboanga were known to originate from this new Tausug base, Spanish surveyors stationed in Zamboanga took note of this and recorded Datu Bantilan's settlement, which by then was conferred the formal recognition as a vassal kingdom of Sulu, the Karajaan of Maluso.

Datu Bantilan died in the middle of 1763. His son, Azim ud-Din II governed Sulu with his brother after the death of their father. By the end of that year, he had become, for all practical purposes, the Sultan.

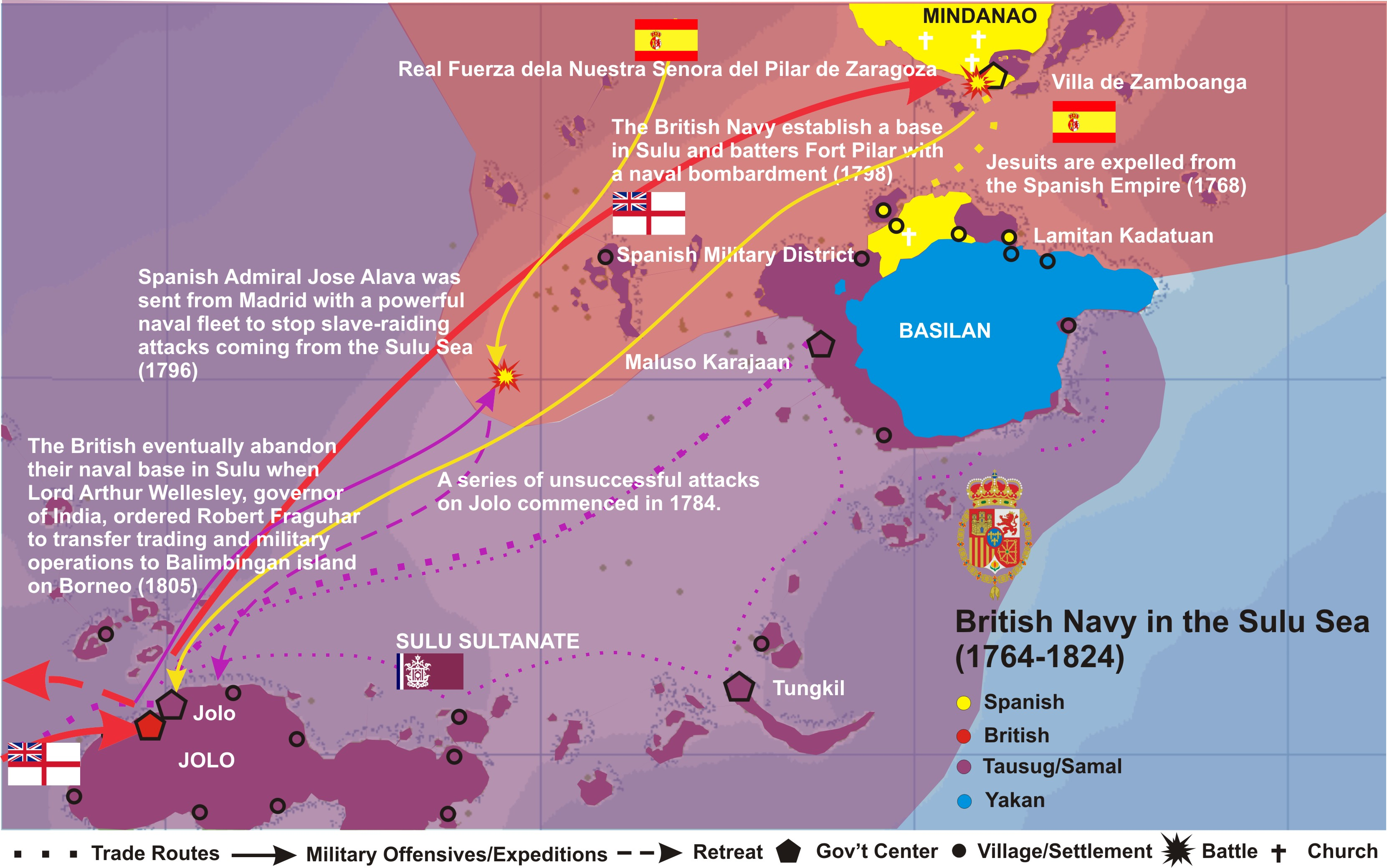

Azim ud-Din, now an old man, finally returned to Jolo in 1764 after Manila fell to the British. In the same year, on June 8, he was formally reinstated to the throne by his British sponsors. In 1774, tired of affairs of state, he formally handed over the throne to his son Muhammad Israil. With the arrival of his uncle Azim ud-Din I from Manila in 1764, whom he received well, Azim ud-Din II left his followers for Parang. Azim ud-Din II returned in 1778 after his cousin's sudden death (which some claim was poisoned by Azim ud-Din II himself), and was promptly proclaimed Sultan and reigned until his death in 1791.

=== The British Navy in the Sulu Sea ===
The Naval Ensign of the United Kingdom of Great Britain and Ireland, standard of the world's most powerful navy in the mid-18th to mid-20th centuries

In 1755, a contingent of 1,900 men led by captains Simeon Valdez and Pedro Gastambide was sent to Jolo to avenge for the raids by Sultan Muiz ud-Din, but were roundly defeated. In 1775, after a Moro raid on Zamboanga, Capitan Vargas led a punitive expedition against Jolo but was repulsed.

The second half of the 18th century saw a new player in the Sulu Zone. After occupying Manila from 1762 to 1764, during the Thirty Years' War between Spain and England, the British withdrew south. There they established trading alliances between the Sulu Sultanate and the British East India Company. Spanish attacks on Jolo were now directed at weakening British trading interests in the south. In 1784, Aguilar conducted a series of unsuccessful assaults against Jolo and in 1796, Spanish Admiral Jose Alava was sent from Madrid with a powerful naval fleet to stop slave-raiding attacks coming from the Sulu Sea. British presence was signaled when in 1798, Fort Pilar in Zamboanga was bombarded by the British navy, which had established a base in Sulu. In 1803, the Lord Arthur Wellesley, governor-general of India, ordered Robert J. Farquhar to transfer trading and military operations to Balambangan island in Borneo. By 1805, the British had withdrawn its military from Sulu.

The year 1815 saw the end of the galleon trade with Mexico as the wars of independence in the Americas was brewing. In 1821, administration of the Philippines fell directly under Madrid after Mexico had become independent. The Madrid government sought to end the “Moro threat.” In 1824, the Marina Sutil, a light and maneuverable armada under Capitan Alonso Morgado encountered the slave raiders in the Sulu Sea and routed the pirates, thus effectively extending Spanish naval supremacy in an increasing area over the Sulu Sea. This naval victory was followed by many more throughout the rest of the 19th century, ultimately reducing the once-unchallenged Tausug navy to a shadow of its former self.

=== The French blockade ===
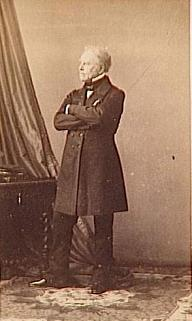
Adm. Jean-Baptiste Thomas Médée Cécille.

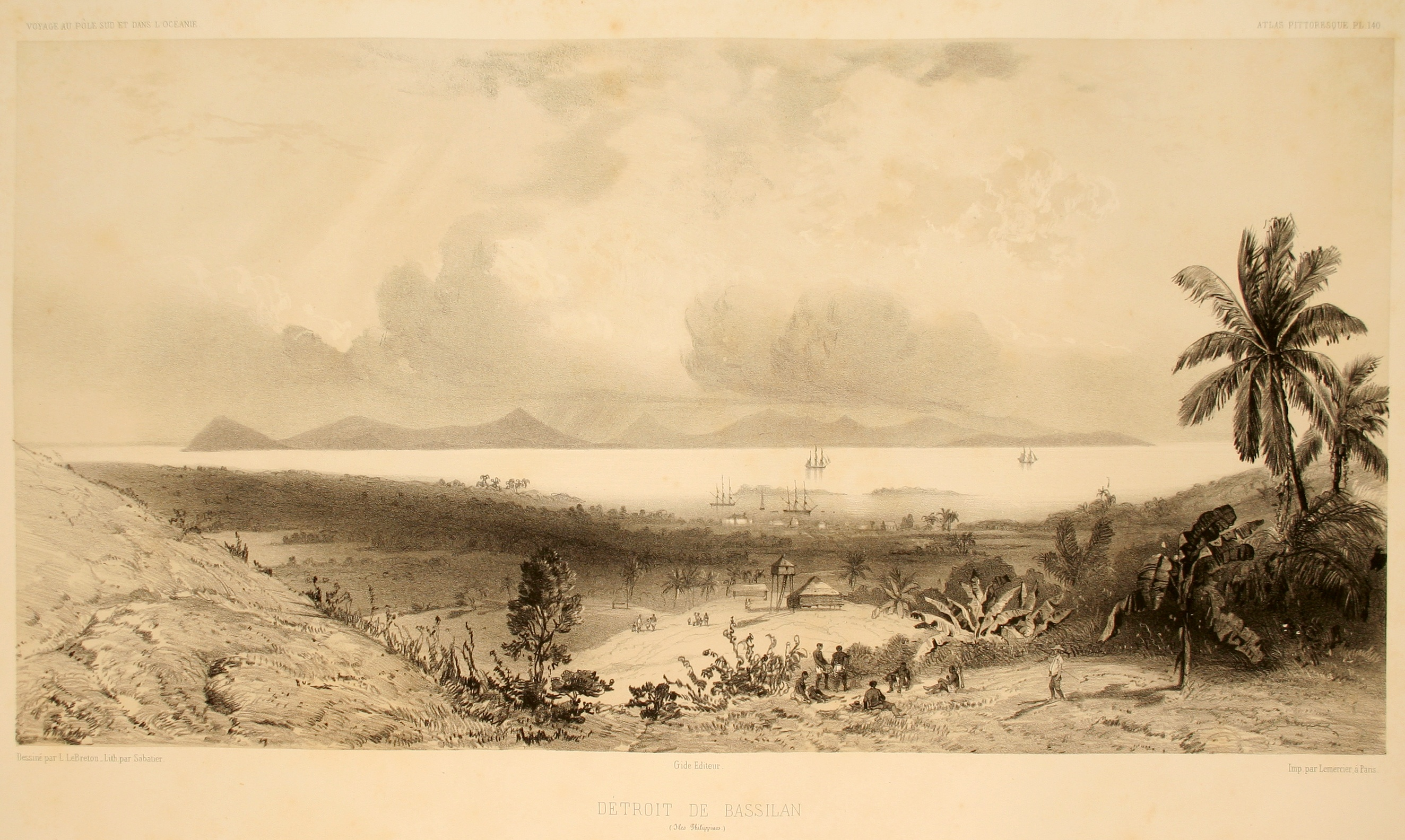
Jules Dumont d'Urville (1846). Voyage au Pôle Sud et dans l'Océanie sur les corvettes L'Astrolabe et La Zélée exécuté par ordre du Roi Pendant les Années 1837–1838–1839–1840 sous le commandement de M. Dumont-d'Urville. Atlas pittoresque. [Journey to the South Pole and Oceania on the Corvettes L'Astrolabe and La Zélée to Execute the Order of the King during the Years 1837–1838–1839–1840 under the Command of Dumont d'Urville. Pictorial Atlas.]. Paris: Gide.

By the 1840s, colonial interests other than Spanish focused over western Mindanao, particularly the territories under the Sulu sultanate. The British, French, Germans, and Americans all became interested in these rich islands.

In 1843, the French Foreign Minister François Guizot sent a fleet to Vietnam under Admiral Cécille and Captain Charner, which started the French intervention in Vietnam. The move responded to the successes of the British in China in 1842, and France hoped to counterbalance these successes by accessing China from the south. The pretext however was to support British efforts in China, and to fight the persecution of French missionaries in Vietnam. The fleet, accompanied by the diplomat Lagrene, tried to seize the island of Basilan in order to create a base similar to Hong Kong, but projects had to be abandoned following the strong opposition of Spain claiming the island was part of the Philippines.

When the French under Admiral Cécille blockaded Basilan in 1844–45, an island which they called Taguime, intent on establishing a network of naval stations to protect French trade in the area, the Spanish governor protested that Basilan had recognized Spain's sovereignty just the year before, in February 1844. The French then forced the Basilan datus to sign a document affirming the “absolute independence of Basilan vis-a-vis Spain” on January 13, 1845, aboard the steamer Archimede.

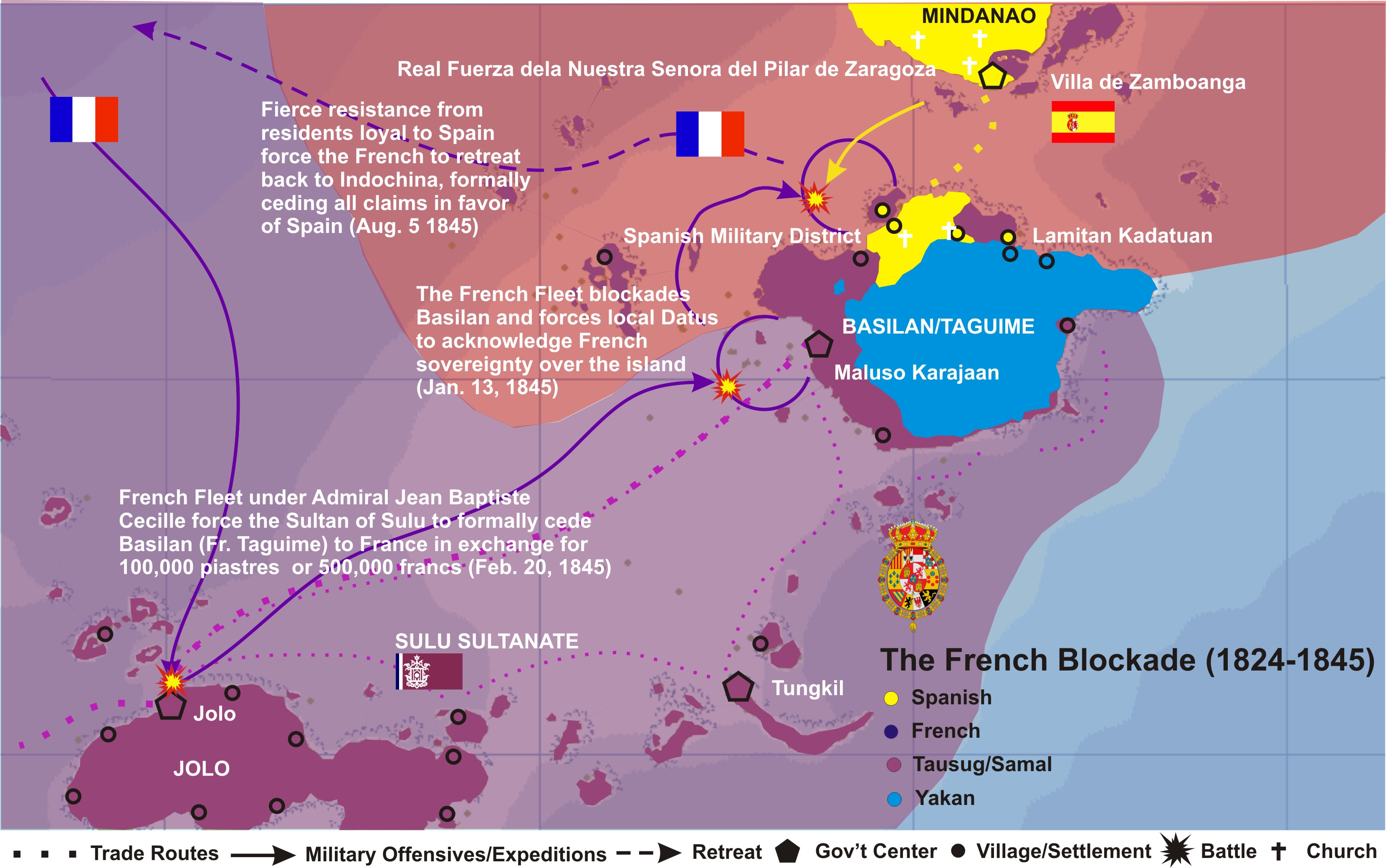

On February 20, 1845, France forced the Sulu Sultan to formally cede Basilan Island to France in exchange for 100,000 piastres or 500,000 French francs. The French Admiral totally ignored Spanish protests. However, the inhabitants of Basilan who remained loyal to Spain, fought against the French for a year, forcing the French King, Louis Philippe, also a Bourbon, to ultimately decide against taking Basilan although the French Cabinet already approved the annexation, even allocating the budget for Basilan for that year.

France's claims on Basilan were based on a formal cession from the Sultan of Sulu as well as formal written agreement from the Basilan datus. These claims were eventually withdrawn by France, formalized in a proclamation dated August 5, 1845, turning over full sovereignty of the island to Spain. During the same year, a US survey mission studied the potentials of the Sulu archipelago, but American intervention did not start until 1899.

=== Fuerte de la Reina Isabel Segunda ===
Coat of arms of Isabella II and other Spanish Monarchs of the House of Bourbon from 1761 to 1931.

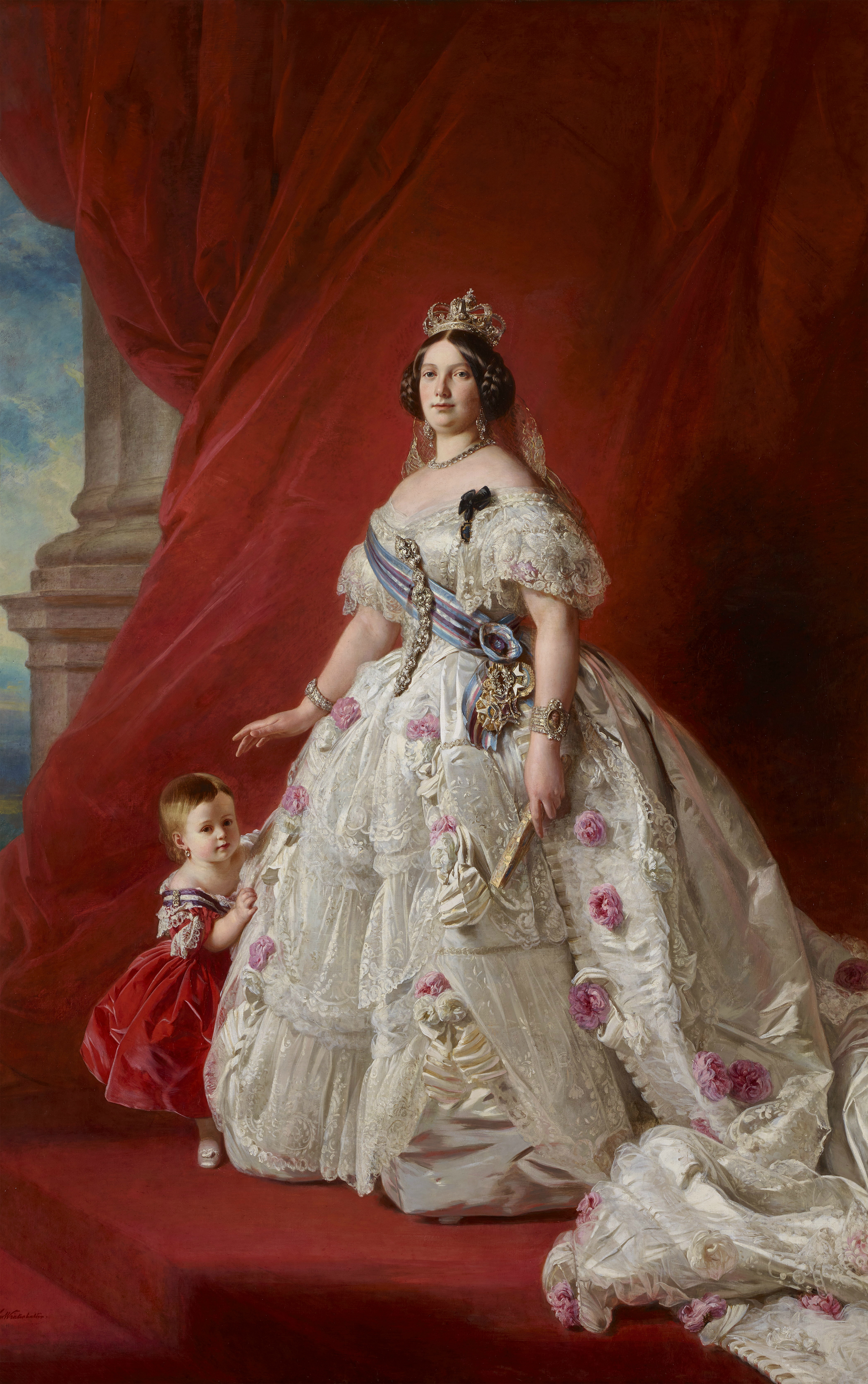
Isabella II, Queen of Spain and the Indies, reigned from September 29, 1833 to September 30, 1868 (she was forced to leave Spain; abdicated in favor of her son: Paris, June 25, 1870)

After two centuries of incessant and unrelenting raids and counter-raids, the fortunes of the Spanish Empire in the Sulu Archipelago took a dramatic turn for the better in 1848, primarily due to three watershed events: (1) the advent of Spain's steam-powered naval superiority over Sulu's outrigger-and-sail paraws; (2) the fall of Sulu's Balangingi allies on Tungkil; and, (3) the establishment of Fuerte Isabel Segunda or Fort Isabella Segunda on Basilan Island. These three benchmarks sparked off a series of events which, from 1848 on, saw Sulu's power wane until it was finally blighted and almost completely snuffed out on the eve of the American occupation.

To check the inroads of both the increasingly bloody Tausug pirate raids and the growing influence of Lamitan's Yakan kingdom, as well as to thwart any further attempt by other European powers to colonize Basilan (the Dutch in 1747 and the French in 1844) the Spanish commandery in Zamboanga City sent over an expeditionary force tasked at establishing Spanish fortifications on Basilan island, both to serve as an early beacon and defensive perimeter against the pirate parties, and as a trading post for Spanish interests on the island.

In 1845, Don Ramon Lobo, the Marine Chief of Zamboanga, accompanied Don Cayetano Suarez de Figueroa, District Governor of Zamboanga, to the coastal settlement of Pasangen. Wooden fortifications were initially erected on the settlement's highest point facing the narrow channel about 800 meters from the shore. The 200-year-old Jesuit mission was situated half-way between the fort and the shore. The fortification proved to be easily defensible as nearby Malamawi Island blocked direct attacks and raids from the sea. Later that same year, Governor Narciso Claveria ordered the construction of a stone fort, following the plan of engineer Emilio Bernaldez submitted in 1844. Construction lasted four years.

By 1848, the stone fort was finished, replacing the wooden fortifications. In the meantime a sizeable and growing Christian settlement continued to flourish around the Recollect mission, rededicated since the expulsion of the Jesuits, to St Isabel de Portugal (Elizabeth of Portugal). The Fort thus established was subsequently named in honor of Queen Isabella II of Spain and the Indies, and was named Fuerte de la Reina Isabel Segunda. The military garrison was initially placed under the direct command of the Fuerza de Nuestra Señora del Pilar de Zaragosa (Fort Pilar) in Zamboanga.

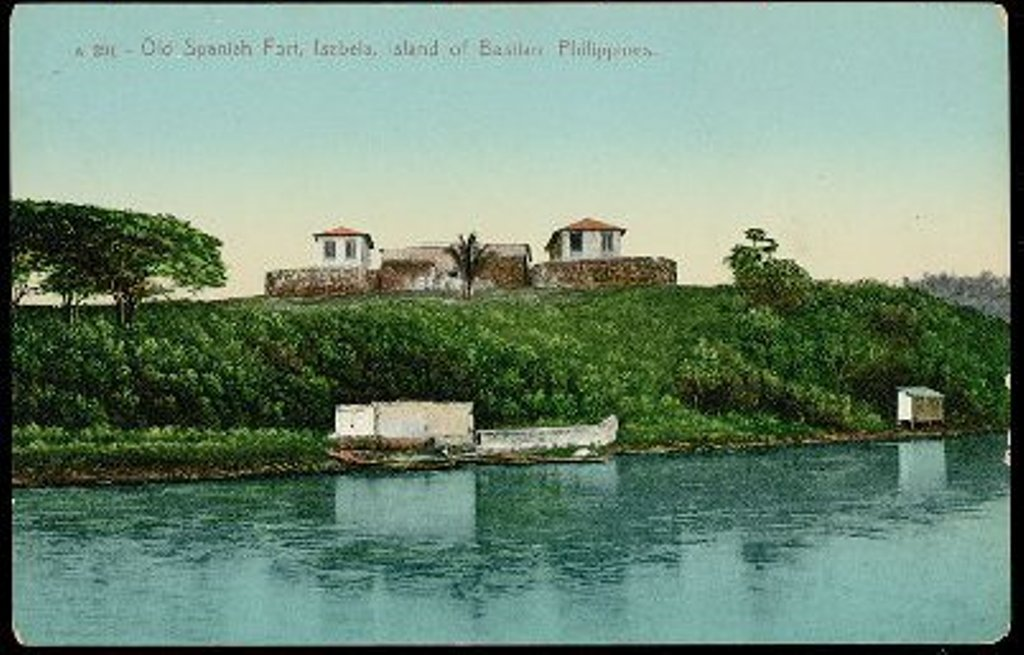
Illustration of Fort Isabella Segunda, Basilan Island, Philippines, current site of the Basilan Provincial Capitol at Isabela City, Basilan.

Nieto Aguilar (1894) describes the fort as “magnificent”. Situated 20 meters above sea level, the fortification overlooked the two entrances to the bay, formed by Basilan and Malamawi Island. To the fort's east were the barracks. The fort had four bastions at the corner of its rectangular perimeter. It enclosed a well and had four structures for the corps of guards, the garrison personnel, the presidio, jail, artillery corps and the casa comandancia.

In the fort was the governor's residence as well as that of his officials. It was also a naval station where the navy maintained small workshops for urgent repairs. It had a storehouse for coal near the shore. Total personnel: two officer, 50 men.

Outside the fort were built other structures, namely: a military infirmary, school, ayuntamiento (city hall), corps of engineers' building, storehouses and dependencies of the naval station, barracks for the marine infantry, gunpowder storehouse, and the Jesuit church and convent.

To further cement the presence of the missionaries in the area, the Augustinian Recollects, under the leadership of Padre Jose Riboste finally built a Church on the site of the old mission, situated opposite the stone fort and across a grassy Plaza nearly halfway between the fort and the shoreline. The Church was completed in 1850, and quickly became the locus of the fledgling Christian town which then grew around it.

=== Fall of Tungkil & Maluso ===
In 1848, Gov. Gen. Narciso Claveria with powerful gunboats Magallanes, El Cano, and Reina de Castilla brought from Europe supervised the attack on Balangingi stronghold in Tungkil. The raid resulted in the capture of many Sama Balangingi and the exile of many to the tobacco fields of Cagayan Valley. However, the leader of the Sama, Panglima Taupan, was not captured. He, along with his closest ally Datu Jalaban Dasido, fled northwards to Basilan, where they hied off, hoping to be able to spring a counter-attack and recoup their tremendous losses. However, with the fall of the Balangingi, a powerful ally of the Sulu Sultanate was decimated, this started the downturn of the sultanate's maritime sea power.

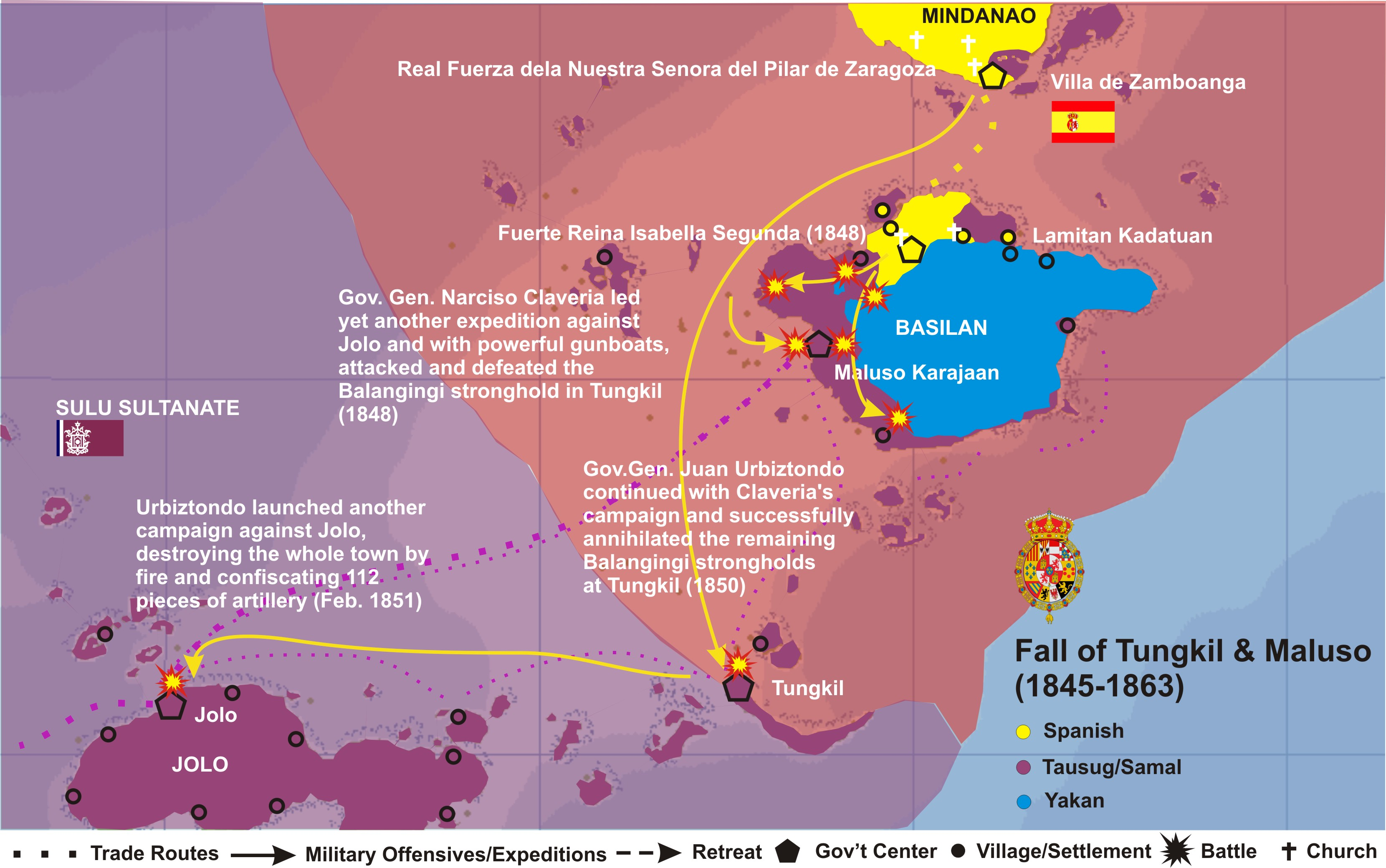

The continuing difficulty posed by the Tausug Karajaan in Maluso to Spanish interests on Basilan exemplified by its willingness to enter into treaties and agreements with other European powers, however, forced the Spanish to rethink this policy of leaving Maluso essentially free from Spanish rule. To ensure the unassailability of Spain's claims over Basilan, a military-naval operation commenced to put an end to the enduring Maluso Kingdom.

From the newly established Fort of Isabella Segunda and the Spanish Naval headquarters also in Isabela, the Spanish forayed into the erstwhile Tausug dominated area of Maluso with a band of Spanish and local troops, attacked the Tausug base led by Zamboanga District Gov. Figueroa, razing coastal Tausug and Samal towns along the way from Isabela. Upon the defeat of the remaining forces of the Maluso Karajaan on May 31, 1849, an army barracks was constructed beside a tree-lined plaza surrounded by a few houses. Finally, after a Tausug counter-attack on Fort Isabela II was repulsed by the Spanish garrison on September 29, 1849, wooden fortifications were built around what eventually became known as the Maluso Poblacion, which during the American era was renamed the Maluso Townsite.

Most of the Tausug and Samal nobility established by the Sulu Sultanate withdrew from Maluso, preferring to return to Jolo and Tawi-Tawi. The majority of the Tausug and Samal settlers, however, opted to remain, even opening ultimately profitable trade relationships with both the Spanish and the Christian indios in Zamboanga and Isabela.

Spanish raids were likewise carried out farther south and towards the western tip of the island, resulting in the surrender of Tausug chieftains Panglima Taupan and Datu Jalaban Dasido on July 16, 1857. Thus, the Spanish effectively pacified nearly all of the Tausug and Samal settlements along Basilan's western coasts.

By then, only the largely Yakan areas of Lamitan and the interior remained outside of Spanish control.

As the situation in the island's western half started to normalize, Christians and Tausugs likewise started a long-lasting socio-political and economic alliance, which when used against the Yakans, proved to be effective in advancing each other's interests for the next century. This Christian-Tausug alliance was only broken in 1988, when a Yakan was finally elected to the highest post in what became the Province of Basilan for the very first time.

=== The Treaty of 1851 ===
In 1850, Gov. Gen. Juan Urbiztondo continued with Claveria's campaign and annihilated the remaining Balangingi strongholds at Tungkil. However, a raid on Jolo that same year was a failure. On 28 February 1851, Urbiztondo launched another campaign against Jolo, destroying the whole town by fire and confiscating 112 pieces of artillery.

On April 30, 1851, a treaty, otherwise known as the "Act of Incorporation into the Spanish Monarchy" was signed between the Spanish authorities and the Sultan of Sulu.

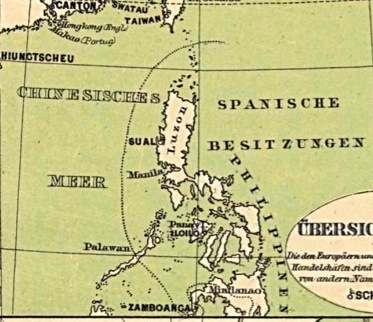
An 1858 German map of the Far East showing the limits of "Spanish Possessions" (Spanische Besitzungen) in the area, clearly including Basilan Island within the Spanish sphere even prior to the Fall of Jolo in 1876.

"A solemn declaration of incorporation and adhesion to the sovereignty of Her Catholic Majesty Isabella II, constitutional Queen of Spain, and of submission to the Supreme Government of the Nation, made by His High Excellency the Sultan of Sulu, Mohammed Pulalun, for himself, his heirs and his descendants, Datus Mohammed Buyuk, Muluk, Daniel Amil Bahar, Bandahala, Muluk Kahar, Amil Badar, Tumanggung, Juhan, Sanajahan, Na'ib, Mamancha and Sharif Mohammed Binsarin, in the name and the representation of the whole island of Sulu, to Colonel Jose Maria de Carlos y O'Doyle, politico-military governor of the Province of Zamboanga, the islands of Basilan, Pilas, Tonkil, and those adjacent thereto, as Plenipotentiary specially authorized by His Excellency Antonio de Urbiztondo, Marquis of Solana, Governor and Captain-General of the Philippine Islands."

Don Pedro Gonzalez led an attack on Balanguingui on September 28, 1853, to complete the depopulation of the area. It is during this attack that Panglima Taupan and Datu Jalaban Dasido fled Balanguingui towards Basilan, landing in the southern coast of Lantawan. Sustained searches across the thick jungles of Basilan by Spanish authorities finally forced both Samal Chieftains to surrender to the Spanish on July 16, 1857.

=== 6th Politico-Military District of Mindanao ===
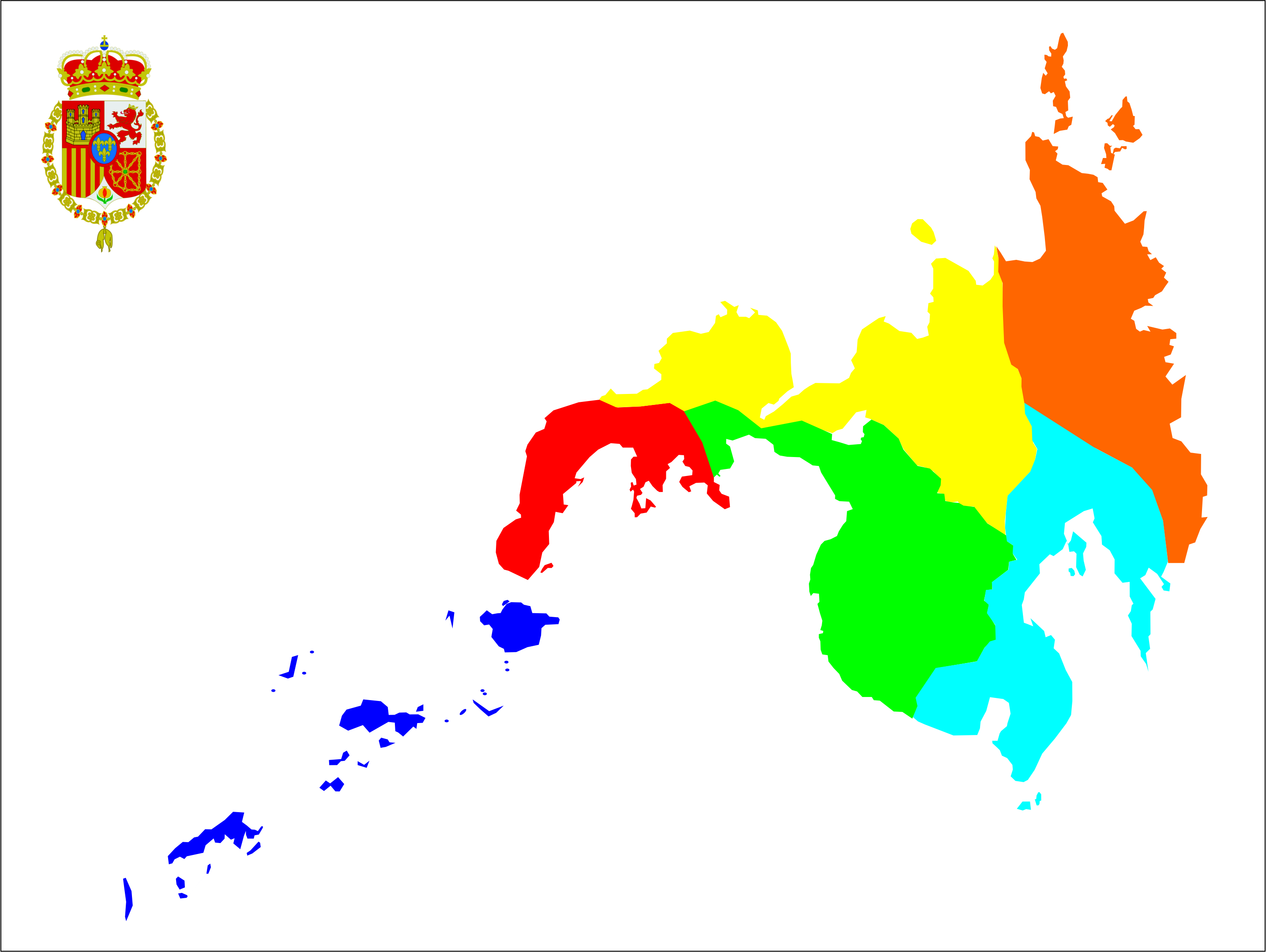
The Six Politico-Military Districts of Mindanao: Zamboanga (red), Misamis (yellow), Surigao (orange), Davao (royal blue), Cotabato (green), Basilan (navy blue)

On July 30, 1859, a royal decree was issued allowing the Jesuits to recover their Missions in Mindanao from the Recollects.

A year after, on July 30, 1860, the Spanish government on the Isla de Gran Molucas (Mindanao) was divided into six Police-Military Districts, namely:

(1) Zamboanga (covering present-day Zamboanga City, Zamboanga Sibugay and the southern part of Zamboanga del Norte up to Sindangan Bay);

(2) Misamis (which covered the rest of Zamboanga del Norte, Misamis Occidental, Misamis Oriental, Lanao del Norte, Bukidnon and the Cities of Dipolog, Dapitan, Cagayan de Oro, Ozamiz, Oroquieta, Tangub and Iligan);

(3) Surigao (covering Agusan del Norte and Sur, and Surigao del Norte and Sur, and the Cities of Butuan, Surigao and Tandag);

(4) Davao (covering all of the Davao Provinces, Davao City, South Cotabato, Sarangani and the Cities of Koronadal, General Santos, Tacurong, Tagum, Digos and Panabo);

(5) Cotabato (covering Zamboanga del Sur, Lanao del Sur, Maguindanao, Sultan Kudarat, North Cotabato and the Cities of Cotabato and Marawi); and

(6) Basilan (covering Basilan, Sulu, Tawi-Tawi and the Cities of Isabela and Lamitan)

Fort Isabela Segunda became the focal point of the 6th District of the Police-Military Government of Mindanao.

Thus, from 1860 until the end of the Spanish regime 39 years later in 1899, the islands of Sulu and Tawi-Tawi and all of their outlying islets were placed under the jurisdiction of Basilan, with its administrative capital in Isabela.

By 1879, the Spanish fleet for the entire southern Philippines was moved to Isabela, where a "floating" Naval Hospital was built on shallows guarding the eastern entrance to the Isabela Channel. The southern shore of nearby Malamawi Island became the repository of the coal used by the Spanish steam-powered naval vessels, and has since been called Carbon (currently a Barangay). Further to the east of the Isabela Channel, the Spanish buried their war-dead on a small tongue of land off Malamawi's Panigayan coast, this area was called Isla Calavera (Eng. Skeleton Island) until rising tides completely submerged it.

=== The fall of Jolo ===
After a series of less-than-successful attempts during the centuries of Spanish rule in the Philippines, Spanish forces captured the city of Jolo, the seat of the Sultan of Sulu, in 1876.

On that year, the Spanish launched a massive campaign to occupy Jolo. Spurred by the need to curb slave raiding once and for all and worried about the presence of other Western powers in the south (the British had established trading centers in Jolo by the 19th century, and the French were offering to purchase Basilan Island from the cash-strapped government in Madrid), the Spanish made a final bid to consolidate their rule in this southern frontier. On 21 February of that year, the Spaniards assembled the largest contingent against Jolo, consisting of 9,000 soldiers, in 11 transports, 11 gunboats, and 11 steamboats. Headed by Admiral Jose Malcampo captured Jolo and established a Spanish settlement with Capt. Pascual Cervera appointed to set up a garrison and serve as military governor; He served from March 1876 to December 1876 followed by Brig.Gen. Jose Paulin (December 1876 – April 1877), Col Carlos Martinez (September 1877 – February 1880), Col. Rafael de Rivera (1880–1881), Col. Isidro G. Soto (1881–1882), Col. Eduardo Bremon, (1882), Col. Julian Parrrado (1882–1884), Col. Francisco Castilla (1884–1886), Col. Juan Arolas (1886-18930, Col. Caesar Mattos (1893), Gen. Venancio Hernandez (1893–1896) and Col. Luis Huerta (1896–1899).

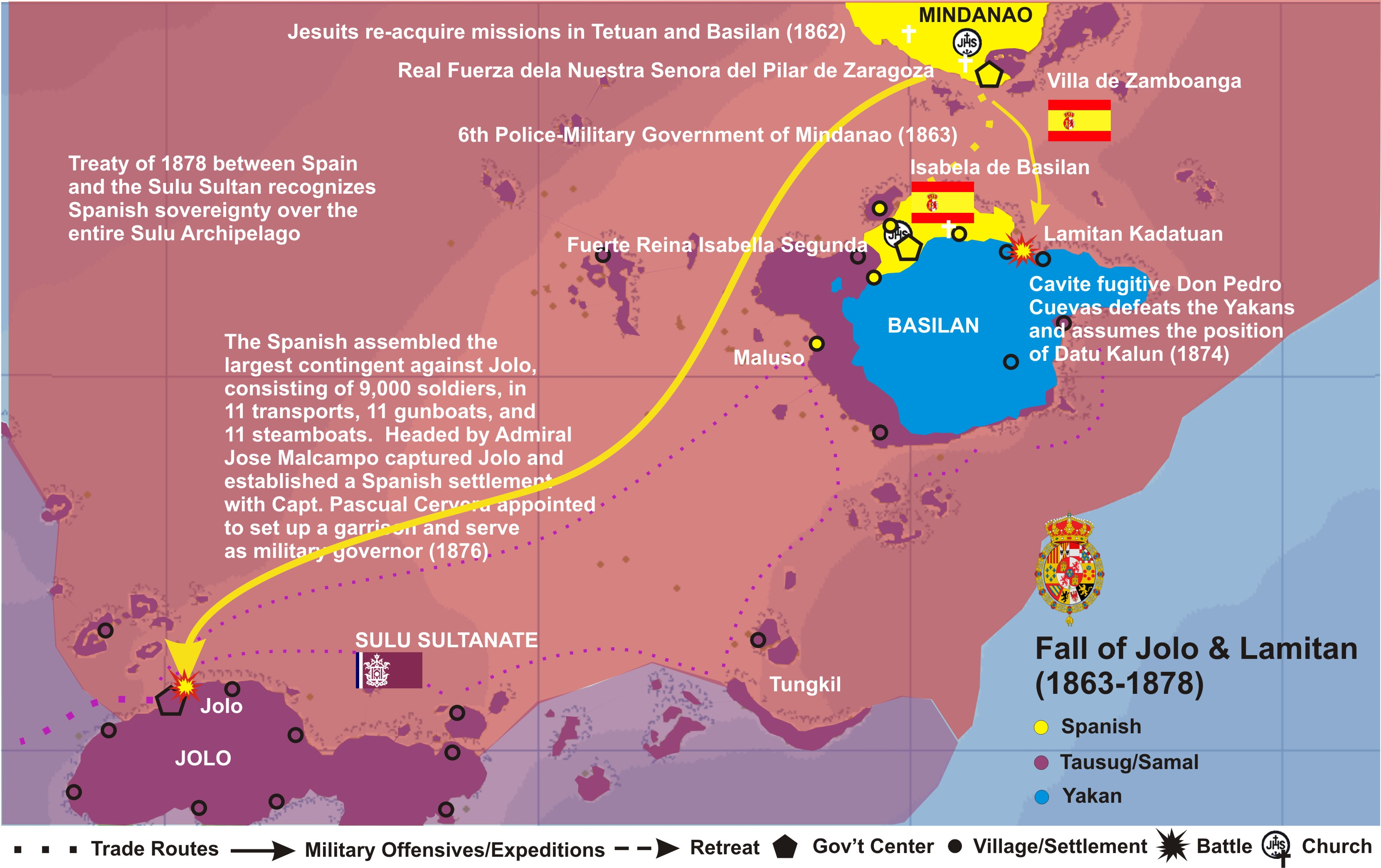

The Spaniards were never secure in Jolo so by 1878 they had fortified Jolo with a perimeter wall and tower gates, built inner forts called Puerta Blockaus, Puerta España, and Puerta Alfonso XII; and two outer fortifications named Princesa de Asturias and Torre de la Reina. Troops, including a cavalry with its own lieutenant commander, were garrisoned within the protective confine of the walls. From Jolo, in 1880 Col. Rafael Gonzales de Rivera who was appointed the governor dispatched the 6th Regiment to Siasi and Bongao islands. The Spaniards were not secure in their stronghold because it would be sporadically attacked. On 22 July 1883, it is reported that three unnamed juramentado succeeded in penetrating the Jolo town plaza and killed three Spaniards.; The word “Ajuramentado” was coined by Spanish colonel Juan Arolas after witnessing several such acts while serving duty in Jolo garrison.

=== Conquest of Lamitan ===
Throughout most of the Spanish regime the advance of Spanish interests was cultivated chiefly in the area around Fort Isabela Segunda or Isabela. A few adventurous colonists from Zamboanga settled in Lamitan over the years, but the area was fairly isolated from Spanish military incursions from Isabela by impenetrable jungles. Even so, a few Christian settlers, mostly traders, lived in Lamitan.

The most common strand about Lamitan's name is relayed thus: "On the island's northeastern coastal plains, the bustling Yakan community was in the midst of a native festival when intrepid Spanish explorers from Zamboanga pulled ashore. When the visitors asked the astonished natives where they were, the Yakans replied that this was their "meeting place" or Lami-Lamihan, which when roughly translated, refers to merry-making or conference. The Spanish explorers recorded this as Lamitan, thus the name."

A more comprehensive study of Lamitan's etymology, however, points to a far less merry circumstance. In fact, studies point to the naming of Lamitan after a Kuta (Fort) built by the Maguindanao warlord Sultan Kudarat on Basilan's northeast coast, to be used as a way-station for attacks carried out against the Spanish in Zamboanga, as well as to guard the sea approach to the Maguindanao Kingdom of Kuta Bato (Cotabato) from the Spanish navy that roamed the area.

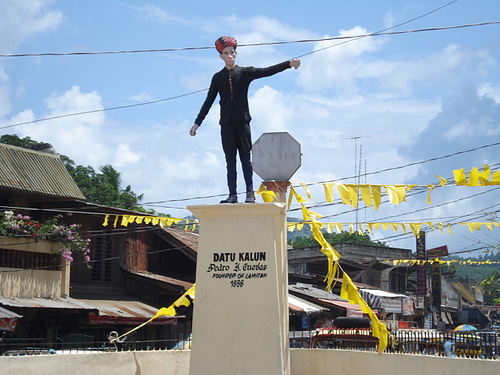
Datu Kalun Shrine, Lamitan City, Basilan. For having subdued Lamitan, Don Pedro Cuevas may be regarded as the Last Conquistador of the Spanish Empire

This fortified garrison eventually became the center of a bustling community of thousands as Yakan farmers, artisans and traders, attracted by the relative safety that the Maguindanao base offered against both Spanish and Tausug attacks. Trade between Basilan and the Mindanao mainland soon ensued, linking this thriving community with another merchant-settlement located along the northern coast of the Pulangui River (Rio Grande de Mindanao), Sultan Kudarat's capital town and a coastal Barangay still called Ramitan to this day. Maranao traders from Ramitan were quartered within the walls of the Kuta, along with their Maguindanao hosts. The Yakans, who traded with the Maranao's thus regarded the Kuta as "the place where the merchants from Ramitan stayed". Eventually, the native Yakans, having difficulty in pronouncing the sound for "r", replaced it, by habit, with the sound for "l". Thus, the Fort was called "Kuta Lamitan" by the natives, and then after the razing of the Fort and the evacuation of the Maguindanao garrison, to simply - Lamitan.

Unlike the earlier Karajaan or Vassal Kingdom of Kumalarang, however, the Yakans of Lamitan, rejected Tausug suzerainty and systems of governance in their territories. They did not fully unite themselves under a single King or Lakan/Raha, choosing instead to consult clan elders or Chieftains which they called Datus or Orang Kayas ("rich men") in a loose confederation called a Kadatuan (similar to the Maranao's Pat a Pangampong Ku Ranao or Maranao Confederation), keeping away for the most part from the Tausug Karajaan of Maluso and the Spanish Reduccion of Isabela, and thus remaining fairly isolated from the pitched battles waged between the Sulu Sultanate and Spain throughout the 17th-19th centuries.

The Yakan therefore largely inhabited the island's eastern half and the interior, and almost by habit, remained hostile to lowlanders throughout the epic clash of civilizations that saw some of its bloodiest confrontations fought on the island. The Yakan likewise remained faithful to their traditional beliefs, a mix of animist customs with Hindu influences, with Islam having been confined for the most part to the higher classes. A significant number moved to Zamboanga during the Jesuit reduccion years (1663–1718), where they were assimilated into society as Christian converts.

Extent of Indias Orientales Españolas or The Spanish East Indies before 1899

In 1874, a fugitive from Cavite named Pedro Cuevas (born 1846) who was remanded to the San Ramon Penal Colony in Zamboanga, escaped the sprawling facility, and found himself hiding from his Spanish jailers in the Yakan enclave of Lamitan.

He stayed in Lamitan for some time, given refuge by Chavacano merchants who traded with the Yakans in the area. He arrived at an opportune time, as it turned out, for a particularly zealous Yakan chieftain named Datu Kalun (also spelled Kalung and Kalum) wanted to rid Lamitan of its small but growing Christian presence. The Christian community got wind of this plan, however, and Pedro Cuevas characteristically volunteered to lead the resistance composed of the Chavacanos and their Yakan converts and sympathizers. In the confrontation between the two groups, the Yakan Datu Kalun was subsequently slain and his supporters roundly defeated. Cuevas then adopted the name of Datu Kalun (Haylaya 1980:43), claiming for himself the vacated position of his defeated enemy. The rest of the Yakan clans were then forced to accept Cuevas as their sole leader soon after. He married one of the daughters of the defeated Yakan chieftain to further cement claims of nobility for himself and his heirs, converted her entire family to Catholicism, and instituted meaningful socio-political changes in the lives of the residents of Lamitan. Datu Kalun consolidated the Yakans, led battles against the slave-raiders from Jolo, and rid Basilan's eastern coast of pirates and marauders.

With his advanced knowledge of Spanish armaments and military tactics of the day, he commanded a group of Yakan warriors, by then converted to Christianity, as well as some Chavacano conscripts from nearby Zamboanga, and proceeded to subjugate the remaining Yakan tribal leaders in the interior by force of arms.

After having consolidated his power over the flourishing Yakan enclave, Don Pedro Cuevas, sent emissaries to the Spanish authorities in Isabela and Zamboanga. For his services as the Last Conquistador of the Spanish Empire, he was eventually pardoned by Gov. Gen. Fernando Primo de Rivera in 1884, and, having formalized his position as leader of the Lamitan District of Basilan island, was finally and officially installed as such in 1886.

=== The Orang Kayas ===
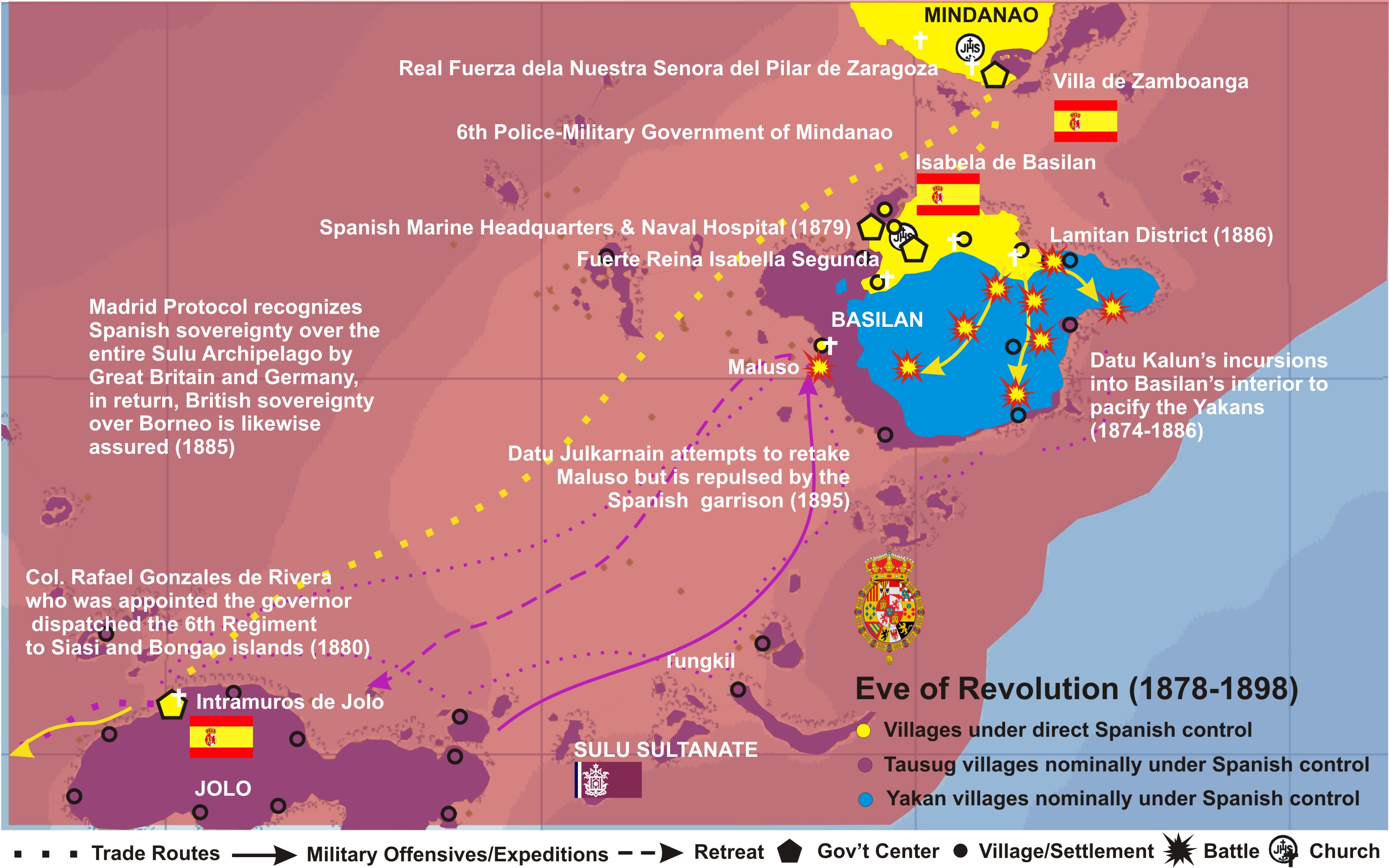

The fall of Jolo, and the subsequent occupation by Spanish forces of the Sultanate's principal town, ended all legitimate claims by the Sultanate of Sulu over Basilan Island. Yakan villages, located in the heavily forested interiors, and situated far beyond any effective direct control by Spanish authorities however, have remained fairly isolated from the rest of the island, with its three main population centers, Isabela, Lamitan and Maluso firmly under Spanish administration.

By 1874, with Spanish support and Christianized Yakan warriors under his wing, Lamitan's conquistador - Datu Kalun - commenced offensives which aimed to pacify the Yakans of Basilan's interior. He was initially successful in so far as he was able to reach the previously impregnable Yakan enclaves in Bohelebung, Tipo-Tipo and Tumahubong, Sumisip, eventually establishing a foothold for the Spanish authorities in these otherwise inaccessible territories.

It was during these heady days of conquest that the names of two notables or "Orang Kayas" (Rich Men) were first made known. The first of these two, Orang Kaya Pukan (Ungkaya Pukan), a Yakan chieftain, ruled and reigned over the relatively untouched, rich southeastern slopes of the island. He held fast against incessant attacks from Datu Kalun's forces for a few years, resisting surrender at a high cost in the lives of his sturdy warriors. He did eventually retreat from his jungle fortress, however, giving up his domain to Datu Kalun in 1884.

Refusing to personally surrender to Datu Kalun, however, Ungkaya Pukan moved his entire clan westward, eventually reaching the settled territory of yet another Chieftain, albeit this time a member of the Samal Bangingi. Orang Kaya Tindik (Ungkaya Tindik), who ruled over much of the southwestern slopes of Puno Mahaji (Basilan Peak) was the son of the Balangingi leader Panglima Taupan. Their clan fled Tongkil after the successful Spanish inroads in 1850, and landed on Basilan's southwestern coast.

The initial contact between Ungkaya Pukan and Ungkaya Tindik was far from friendly, with several battles being fought between the two clans for what seemed like a steadily shrinking realm.

Having realized their equally untenable positions vis-a-vis the Spanish and the Tausugs on two fronts, however, the Chieftains eventually came to an alliance, agreeing to accommodate each other's clans, with Ungkaya Pukan having been given the area around Canibungan, Lantawan to settle after marrying one of Ungkaya Tindik's daughters.

=== Treaty of 1878 and the Philippine Revolution ===
The Spanish and the Sultan of Sulu signed the Spanish Treaty of Peace on July 22, 1878. The Spanish-language version of the Treaty gave Spain complete sovereignty over the Sulu archipelago, this includes Basilan, while the Tausug version described a protectorate instead of an outright dependency.

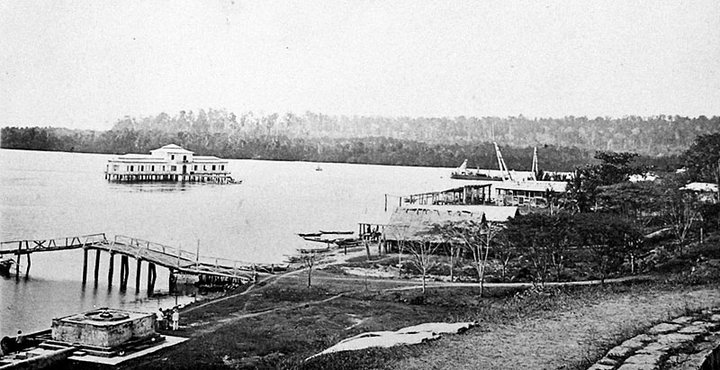
Spanish Naval Hospital with Aguada's old pontoon bridge on the foreground. Photo was taken atop Fort Isabela Segunda, 1901. Malamawi Island can be seen in the background.

The book Mindanao: Su Historia y Geografía Por José Nieto Aguilar Con un prologo de Don Francisco Martín Arrúe (Madrid, Imprenta del Cuerpo Administrativo del Ejército. 1894) describes the Sixth Politico-Military District of Basilan as such:

Sexto distrito: Basilan.—La isla de Basilan, que con la extremidad SO. de Mindanao forma el estrecho de su nombre, es la mayor y principal de este grupo.

Se halla situada entro los 127° 59′ 30″ y 128° 44′ 30″ de longitud E. y entre los 6° 25′ á 7° 45′ 1″ latitud N.

El establecimiento militar de la Isabela de Basilan se halla próximamente á media longitud del canal, en la embocadura del río Pasahan ó de la Isabela. Al S. de él, y á corta distancia, tiene un fuerte, elevado 20 metros sobre el nivel del mar, que domina las dos entradas, y á su parte E. se halla el cuartel. Es también estación naval, en donde la marina militar tiene algunos pequeños talleres para sus más urgentes atenciones, y los depósitos de carbón se hallan enfrente del pueblo, sitio que es el más á propósito para fondear.

Aguada.—Esta se encuentra no lejos del fuerte; antes del establecimiento de la Isabela sólo se conocía la del río Gumalaran, en cuya barra se encuentra casi siempre un metro de agua á bajamar, teniendo cuidado con dos cabezos de roca que no descubren. El agua se hace en pequeñas cascadas á media milla hacia dentro.

Las islas principales de este grupo son unas 40, ocupadas por moros de los mismos usos y costumbres que los de Mindanao, siendo la superficie total de 68.320 hectáreas.

La Isabela, pueblo el más importante de la isla y la capital del distrito, está situada en un declive pedregoso, dominándola el fuerte llamado de Isabel II. Este consta de cuatro baluartes que ocupan los ángulos del rectángulo que lo forma. Está rodeado de foso y tiene cuatro edificios que están destinados para cuerpo de guardia, cuartel para el destacamento, presidio y calabozos, fuerza de artillería y casa Comandancia.

Los principales edificios de la colonia son: Enfermería militar., Escuela, Casa Ayuntamiento, Comandancia de Ingenieros, Almacenes y demás dependencias de la Estación naval, Cuartel de Infantería de Marina, Hospital, Polvorín, Iglesia y convento de jesuitas

Industria.—La de este distrito se reduce á la venta de artículos para el consumo del Ejército y Marina y algunas telas que los chinos cambian á los moros por los productos agrícolas y algún balete y concha que se recoge en aquellos mares.

Agricultura.—El terreno cultivado no pasa de 8 á 10 hectáreas, dedicadas al cultivo de caña dulce, arroz, café, cacao, maíz y algunas hortalizas.

Los principales artículos que el comercio importa son aceite, arroz, café, cacao, azúcar refinado, vino, garbanzos y otros artículos de Europa.

In 1895, the Sultan of Sulu sent one of his most accomplished generals, Datu Julkarnain, to regain control over Basilan, only to be defeated by the combined forces of the Spanish and their local ally, Datu Kalun. The ensuing peace encouraged more Christians to settle in Basilan.

By this time, the Katipunan (revolutionary organization) had gained enough momentum in Luzon and the Philippine War of Independence was engaged in 1896. In Mindanao, locals' resistance contributed greatly to the weakening of the Spanish colonizers. The Spanish campaigns against the "Moros" - a derogatory term used by the Spanish against the Muslim Filipinos - likewise caused heavy casualties and depleted Spanish resources (Haylaya 1980).

While Zamboanga and Sulu were the centers of Spanish-Muslim hostilities, Basilan's inhabitants remained fairly unaffected by the social upheavals. Still, the indigenous Yakans, together with the considerable Tausug, Samal and Bajau populations on the island were among those natives called Moros by the Spaniards (Jundam 1983:8-9).

An American paper on Mindanao, Basilan and Sulu at the end of the Spanish–American War contains the following report:

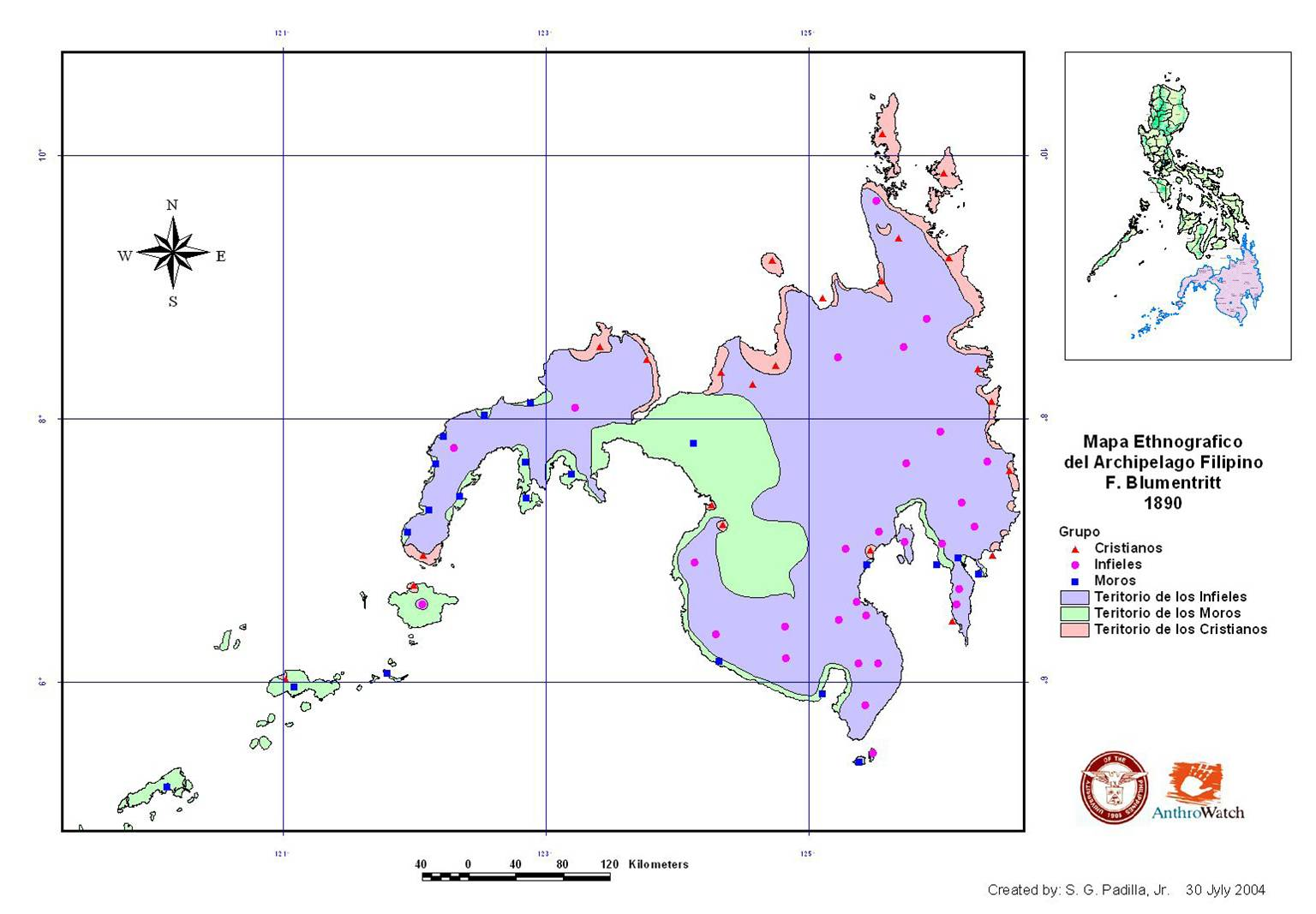
Mindanao c. 1890; the map was made by Rizal's friend, Dr. Ferdinand Blumentritt

"At the end of the Spanish era, Basilan's garrison was reduced to 2 officers and 50 men stationed on the Fort of Isabella Segunda. However, Isabela, which was the Naval headquarters for the south was garrisoned by 30 marines 27 sailors in addition to ship's crews. There were two brigades of marine infantry in the Philippines, composed of 375 men and 18 officers. Most of this force, including the 18 war vessels in Philippine waters, were used at one time or another, for the suppression of Moro piracy. The naval expenditure in the later period of Spanish occupancy amounted to more than $2,500,000 per year.

"The total fighting force of the Moros at the close of the Spanish–American War appears to have been about 34,000 warriors. This total was made up of 19,000 in Mindanao, 10,000 in Sulu and about 5,000 on Basilan Island.

"The total Moro population of the Philippines was about 380,000. Due to the absence of birth statistics among Mohammedans, any population figure can only be an estimate. A considerable percentage of the population of Sulu was transient, moving from Sulu to Borneo according to their desires.

"The Yakans, a tribe of mountain Moros, many of whom are pagans. About 20,000 of them are found on the Island of Basilan, fifteen miles from Zamboanga. They are famous for the excellence of their outrigger canoes or vintas and they supply many of the other Moro tribes with these vessels."

On September 21, 1897, a temblor rocked the Sulu Sea basin sending 100-foot waves which ravaged and flattened Basilan North-western coast. Isabela itself was badly hit, with waves reaching as far up as the foot of the Spanish stone fort. To be sure, the damage was minimized due to the presence of Malamawi Island which save much of the small town from utter destruction. Some accounts of an apparition of St. Elizabeth of Portugal (Sta. Isabel de Portugal) holding back the waves from completely engulfing the entire town, led to the celebration of the annual Terremoto Festival, featuring a fluvial parade along the Isabela Channel.

The Philippine Revolution against Spain seems to have made no impact in Basilan. However, when the United States defeated Spain in the Philippines, many Spaniards, including Spanish clergy evacuated the Philippines. By January 15, 1899, it already became necessary to call a plebiscite at Isabela to form some kind of Government in Basilan. This plebiscite appointed Don Ramon Larrachochea as Governor and Don Pedro Javier Cuevas (aka Datu Kalun) was made Mayor of Isabela.

On May 16, 1899, all the Spaniards in Basilan, led by the last Spanish Military Governor of Mindanao's Sixth District, Capt. Jose Llobregat y Martin, evacuated and left the island to Don Pedro Javier Cuevas, who was later elected Jefe Provisional by the town council.

This Provisional Government ruled and protected Basilan until the military representatives of the United States Government took formal possession of the island on December 8, 1899.

== American regime ==
The Great Seal of the United States of America

By 1898, Basilan Island was administratively divided into three districts, i.e., (1) Isabela de Basilan (capital), (2) Lamitan, and (3) Maluso.

Spain ceded the Philippine islands to the United States in the Treaty of Paris which ended the Spanish–American War. Following the American occupation of the northern Philippine Islands during 1899, Spanish forces in Mindanao were cut off, and they retreated to the garrisons at Zamboanga and Jolo. American forces relieved the Spanish at Zamboanga on May 18, 1899, and at Basilan seven months after.

=== American occupation ===
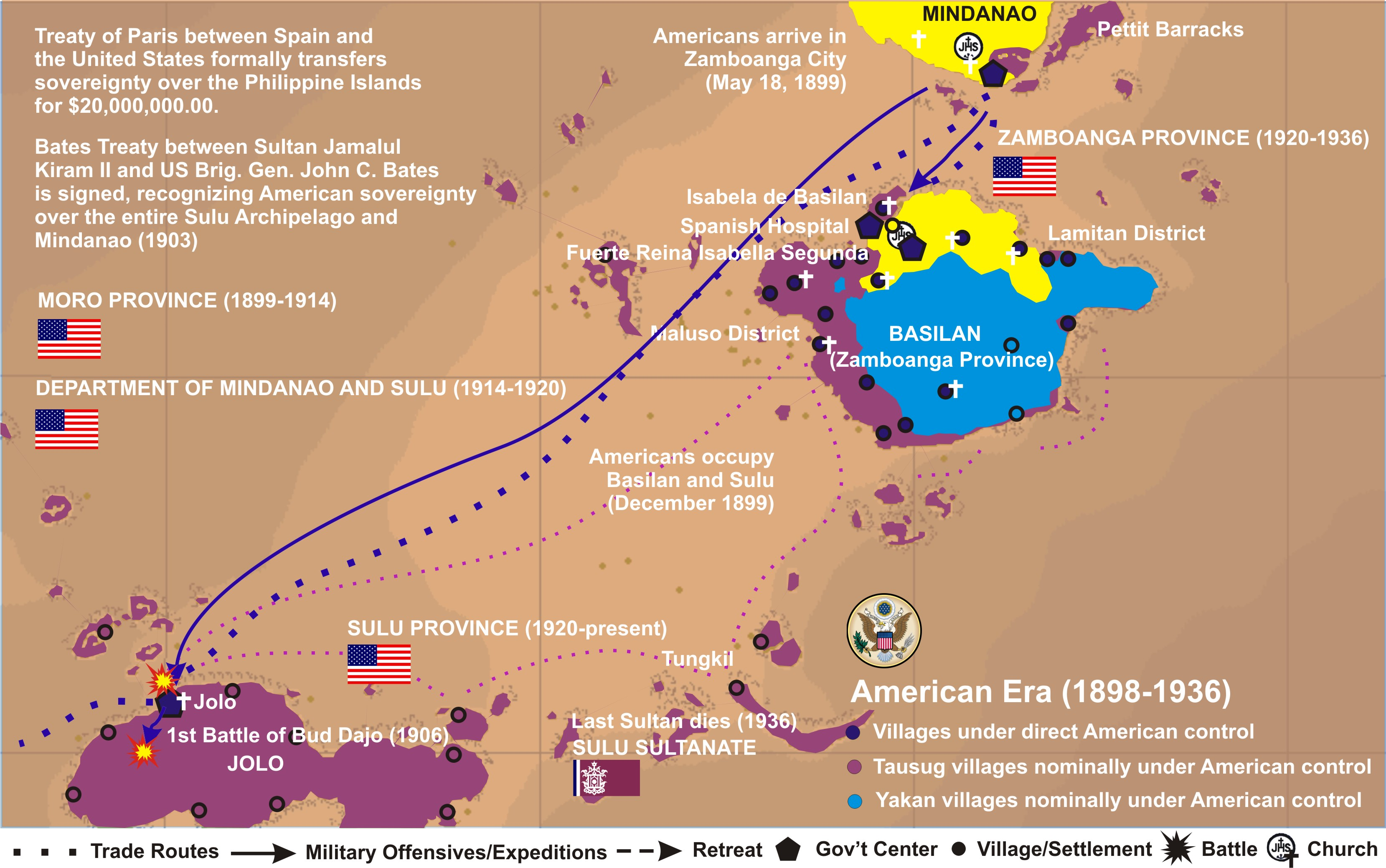

On December 8, 1899, the Americans led by Col. James S. Petit occupied the Spanish naval base of Isabela de Basilan. In Basilan, an increasingly old and sickly Datu Kalun (Pedro Cuevas) supported the new colonizers. Sovereignty over both Isabela and Lamitan then was effectively transferred from Spain to the Americans.

At that time, the Philippine–American War was raging in Luzon. So as not to spread out their forces, the Americans employed the classic divide-and-rule tactic. Maj. Gen. E.S. Otis, commander-in-chief of the US Forces, sent Gen. Bates to negotiate with the Sultan of Sulu. Known as the Bates treaty, the agreement provided for the exercise of American authority over the Sulu archipelago in exchange for the recognition of Muslim culture and religion.

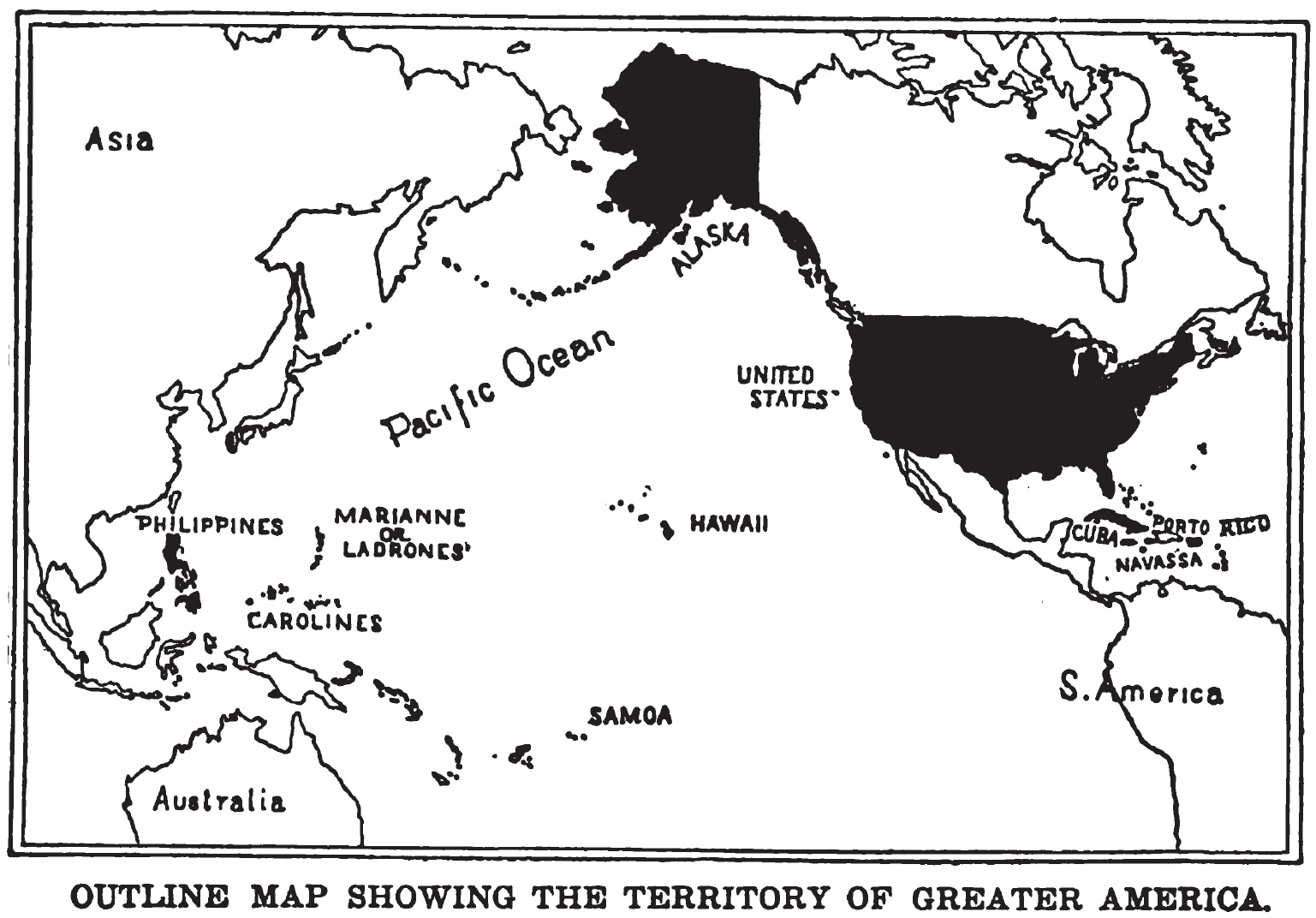
Map of the United States of America and its colonies, dependencies and protectorates, 1899.

The Kiram-Bates Treaty of 1899 between Sulu Sultan Jamalul Kiram II and American Brigadier General John C. Bates, further acknowledged American administrative control over the Sulu Archipelago, including Basilan.

Initially Sultan Kiram was disappointed by the hand-over of control to the Americans and had expected to regain sovereignty over the Sulu archipelago after the defeat of the Spanish. Bates' main goal though, was to guarantee the Sultanate's neutrality in the Philippine–American War, and to establish order in Mindanao. After some negotiations, the Kiram-Bates Treaty was signed.

This treaty was based on the earlier Spanish treaty, and it retained the translation discrepancy: the English version described a complete dependency, while the Tausug version described a protectorate. Although the Bates Treaty granted more powers to the Americans than the original Spanish treaty, the treaty was still criticized in America for granting too much autonomy to the Sultan. One particular clause, which recognized the Moro practice of slavery, also raised eyebrows in Washington, D.C. Bates later admitted that the treaty was merely a stop-gap measure, signed only to buy time until the war in the north was ended and more forces could be brought to bear in the south.

The peace created by the Bates Treaty did not last, however. This became evident when the Muslims repudiated the Moro province, a politico-military government in Mindanao lasting from 1903 to 1914, and the Moro Rebellion soon broke out. Barely two months before the creation of the Moro province, the American colonial government declared and classified all unoccupied lands as public lands. Immediately after the declaration, American investments entered Mindanao and mass migration of Christians was encouraged. (Rodil 1985:4).

The American forces eventually arrived under the command of Capt. Wendell C. Neville, who eventually became a major general, the 14th Commandant of the United States Marine Corps, in 1929–30. He was initially posted as military governor of Basilan from 1899 to 1901, and was tasked at the establishment of a civil government for the island of Basilan.

By July 1, 1901, the Municipality of Zamboanga was inaugurated under Public Act No. 135. This constituted Zamboanga and Basilan Island.

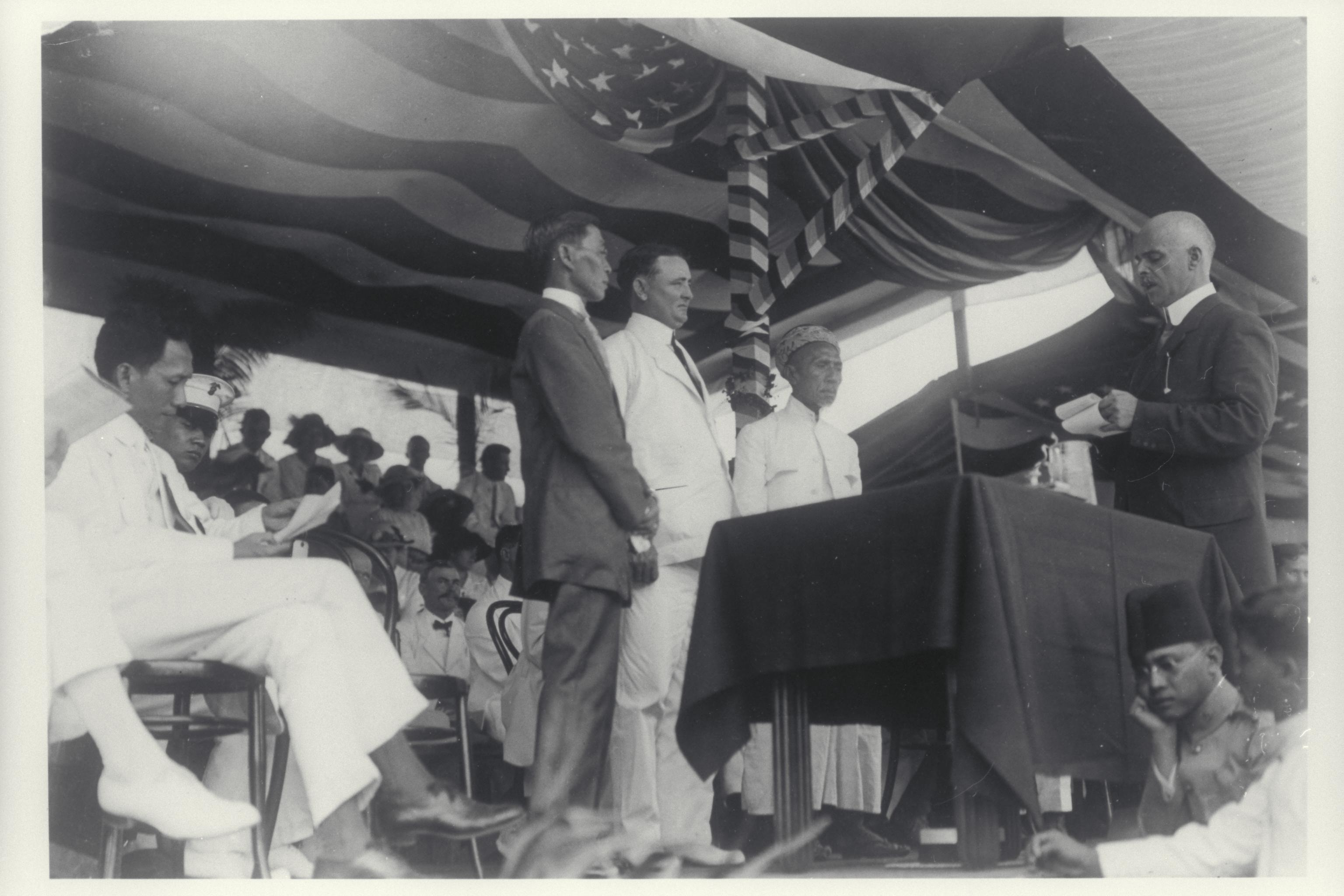
Inauguration of the Municipality of Zamboanga which included Basilan, July 1, 1901, with Datu Kalun (background) in attendance

On September 15, 1911, the governing body of the Moro Province, the Legislative Council, passed Act. No.272 converting the Municipality of Zamboanga into a city with a Commission form of government. The ceremony was held on January 1, 1912, with the appointment of American Christopher F. Bader as the first City Mayor. With the island of Basilan as part of Zamboanga, this made the City of Zamboanga the biggest city in the world in terms of land area. Two years later he was succeeded by Victoriano Tarrosas the first Filipino Zamboangueño Mayor of the city when Bader resigned.

The Department of Mindanao and Sulu replaced the Moro Province in 1914, and its districts broken up into separate provinces, namely: Davao, Misamis, Lanao, Cotabato, Sulu, and Zamboanga, the city was then reverted to its original status as a municipality administered by a Municipal President and several Councilors. The municipality included the whole of Basilan Island and it remained as the capital of the Department of Mindanao and Sulu, with a civil government under an American civil governor, from 1913 up to 1920.

The Department of Mindanao and Sulu under Gov. Frank W. Carpenter was created by Philippine Commission Act 2309 (1914) and ended on February 5, 1920, by Act of Philippine Legislature No. 2878. The Bureau of Non-Christian Tribes was organized and briefly headed by Teofisto Guingona, Sr. With the enactment by the US Congress of the Jones Law (Philippine Autonomy Law) in 1916, ultimate Philippine independence was guaranteed and the Filipinization of public administration began.

Datu Kalun died in Basilan on 16 July 1904 at the age of 58, soon after his first contact with the Americans. His nephew Gabino Pamaran became his successor and adopted the name Datu Mursalun. Mursalun, also pro-American, led the town of Lamitan which became an American model of civil government and development. Mursalun worked for the material progress of Basilan, and sought ways to fight banditry and piracy in the area.

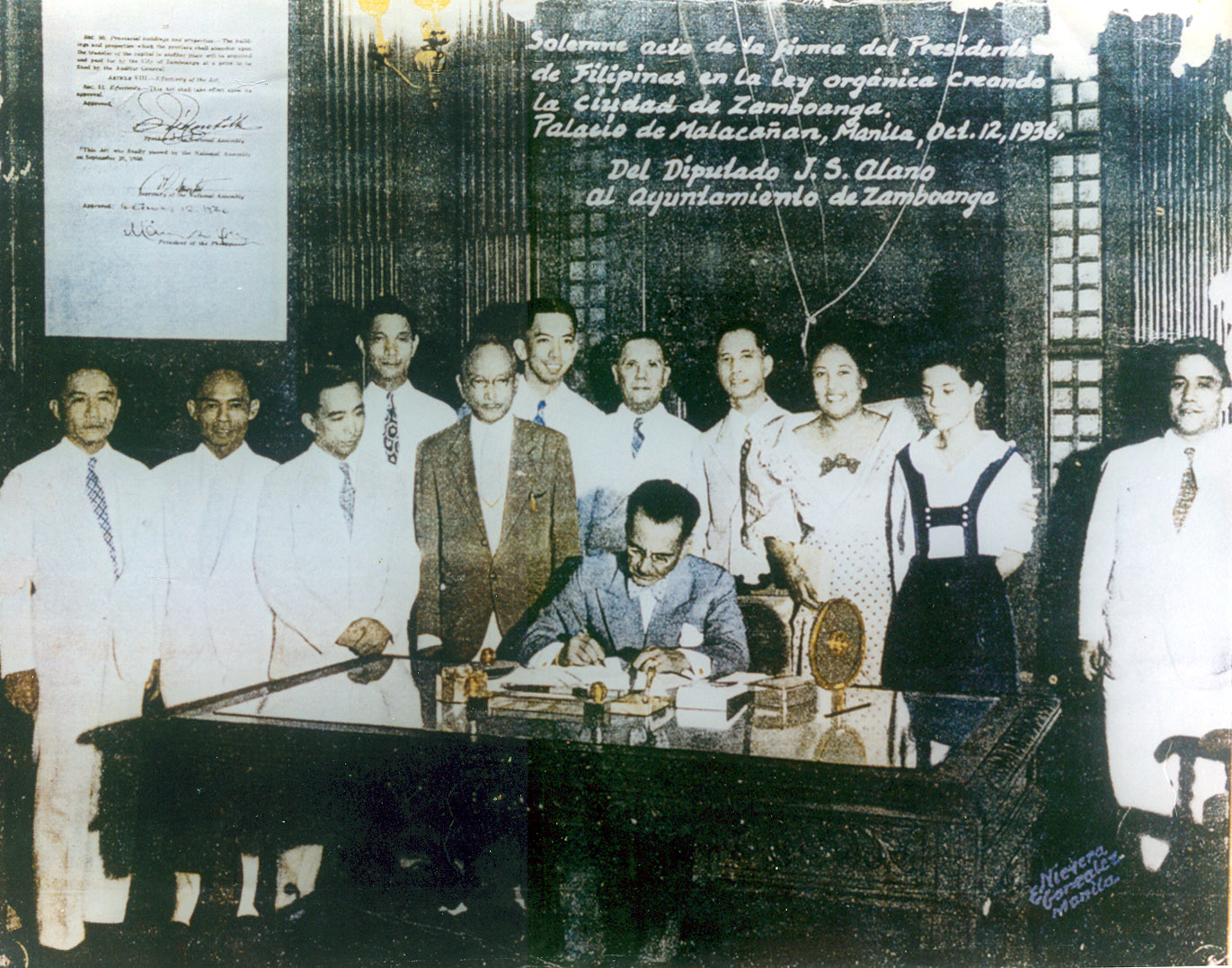
Official Signing Ceremony of the Charter of Zamboanga City by President Manuel Quezon, and witnessed by bill author Cong. Juan S. Alano and wife Ramona, Zamboanga Mayor Pablo Lorenzo, and a young Ma. Clara Lorenzo (Lobregat) in her school uniform.

=== Philippine Commonwealth ===
Politically, Basilan became a part of the Moro Province (1899–1914, encompassing most of Mindanao Island). Basilan was then included in the Department of Mindanao and Sulu (1914–1920), a district of Zamboanga Province (1920–1936), and then of the Chartered City of Zamboanga (1936–1948), before it became a Chartered City on its own right at the beginning of the Philippine Republic.

Alongside military suppression came a policy of education. Public schools were built but Muslim enrollment was way below Christian school attendance. Muslims considered public education a threat to their culture and religion.

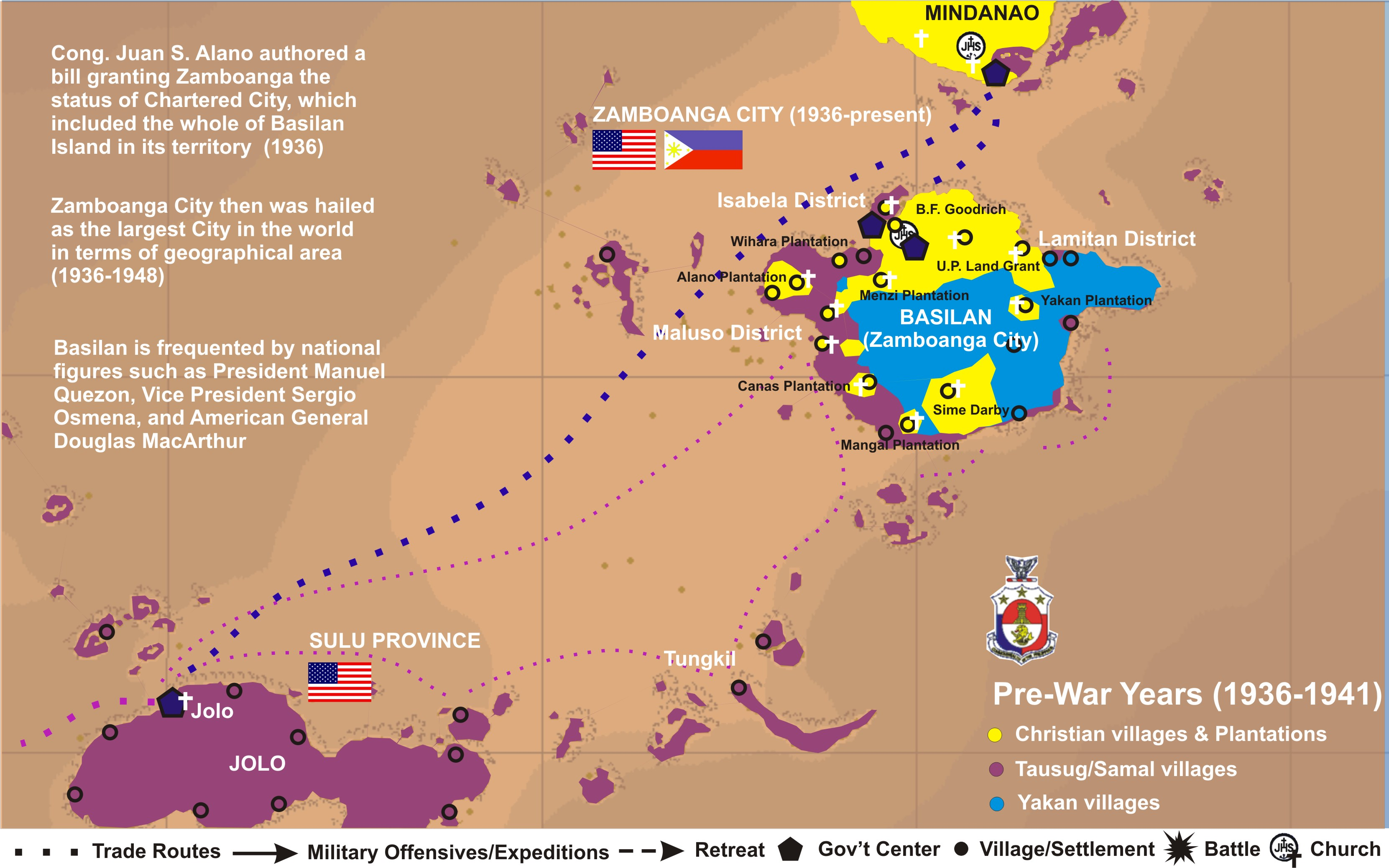

To ensure Muslim participation in government affairs, the Americans soon adopted a Policy of Attraction for western Mindanao. Moreover, the Philippine Constabulary (PC) replaced the United States Army units pursuant to colonial efforts to reduce American presence. The replacement of American troops, mostly by Christians under the PC, increased the hostility between Muslims and Christians.

In the political sphere, the management of Muslim affairs through the organization of the Department of Mindanao and Sulu in 1914 was unsuccessful, as leadership in the department fell in the hands of Christians. Thus, the Muslim leaders were historically opposed to the idea of independence, which meant the incorporation of Muslim areas into a political system dominated by Christians.

Early in the American period, American plantation owners cleared vast expanses of Basilan's virgin forest land and established what was to be Basilan's primary economic activity - plantation agriculture, mainly rubber and copra. American Dr. James D. W. Strong, the Father of the Philippine Rubber Industry, inaugurated the first rubber plantation in the Philippines (inauguration was attended by President Manuel L. Quezon no-less) in Baluno, a plaque and shrine to this pioneering individual may be visited in the same Barangay to this day.

The success of what was soon to be the B. F. Goodrich rubber concession in the northern part of Isabela City, enticed other multi-national firms, such as the British-Malaysian Sime Darby and the Hispano-German Hans Menzi Corporation to open rubber plantations in the City's southern areas. The first Filipino-owned plantation was established on Malamawi Island by Don Juan S. Alano, originally of Malolos, Bulacan, who served as Representative of the entire Moro Province (Mindanao) during the Commonwealth Era (1936–1942), and the first Congressman of Zamboanga Province (now comprising Zamboanga del Norte, Zamboanga del Sur, Zamboanga Sibugay, Zamboanga City and Basilan) in the Republic's first Congress (1946–1949). He authored the Charter of both the Cities of Basilan and Zamboanga.

More Filipino settler families, such as the Cuevas-Flores-Pamaran-Antonio clan (progeny of the legendary Datu Kalun) in Lamitan and the Pardo, Barandino, Brown, Dans, Biel, Encarnacion, Dela Pena, Luistro, Zagala and Nuñal families of Isabela itself soon followed suit, establishing sizeable plantations, usually engaged in coconut/copra production.

=== Japanese invasion ===
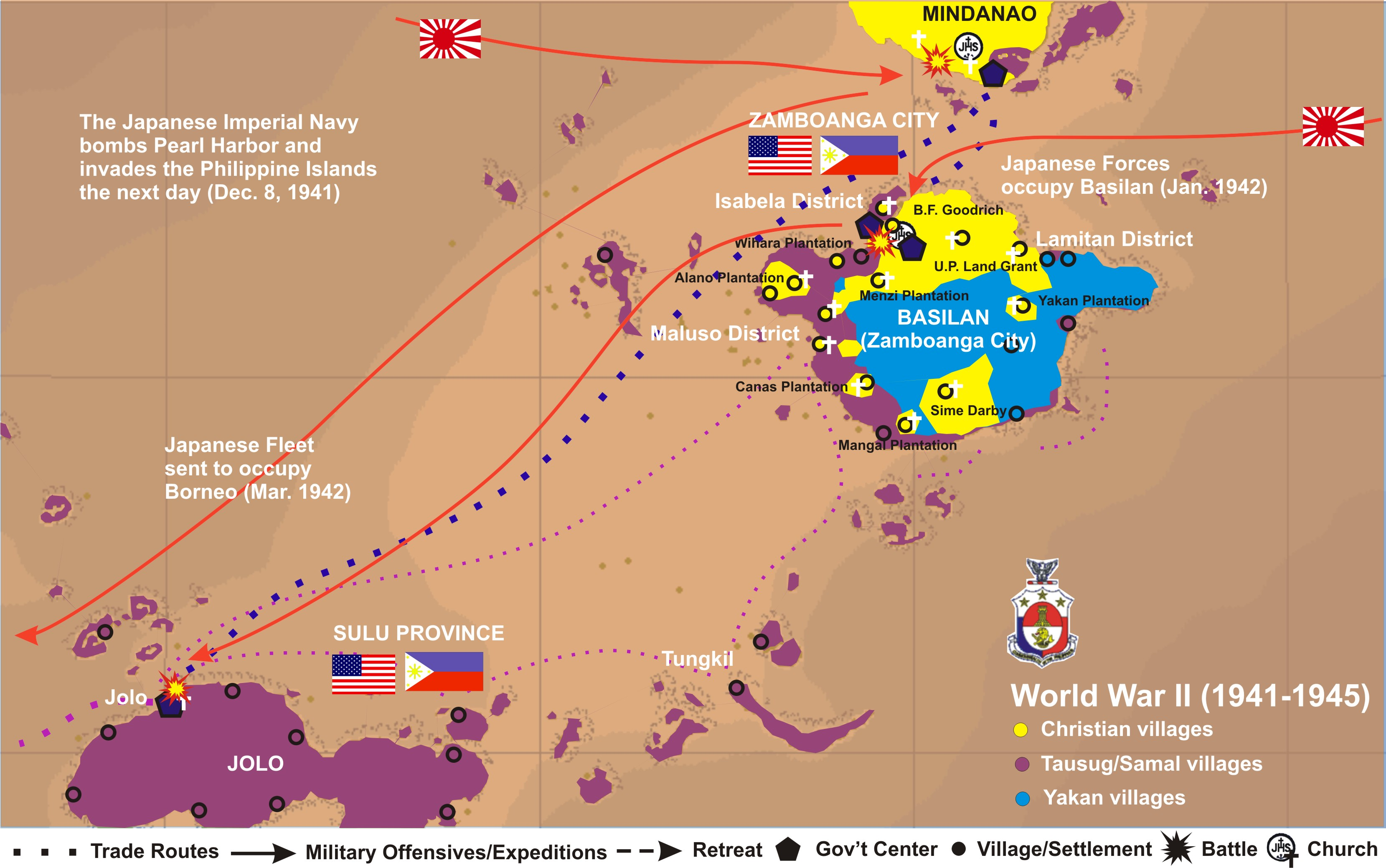

The outbreak of World War II disrupted Commonwealth administration. In 1942 Japanese soldiers landed in Basilan and occupied it until 1945.

Christians and Muslim officers and men of the military district in Mindanao and Sulu shifted to the Moro guerilla activities against the Japanese. A civil government called Free Sulu Government administered activities in the locality. At that time, Elpidio Sta. Elena was the municipal president in Isabela, Monico E. Luna was Treasurer, Joe Borja the Chief of Police, and R.C. Climaco was Justice of the Peace. They conducted the affairs of the local government from Fort Isabella Segunda throughout the duration of the war. Behind the Fort, overlooking Aguada River and the water fountain serving hundreds of homes, there was a large pit – used by the Japanese soldiers to bury Filipino and American casualties, usually beheaded with the sword! (from Cawa-Cawa Smorgasbord, by R C Climaco)

The Japanese Occupation forces established a government in Basilan to govern both Zamboanga and Basilan. The Japanese Occupation of Basilan was rather uneventful, however, it barely affected the residents, except in terms of Japanese demand for food for their military machinery. In fact, Datu Mursalun and his family watched, without much interest, the American bombings of the Spanish fort and naval hospital in Isabela which signaled the retaking of Basilan by joint Filipino and American troops in 1945.

=== Liberation ===
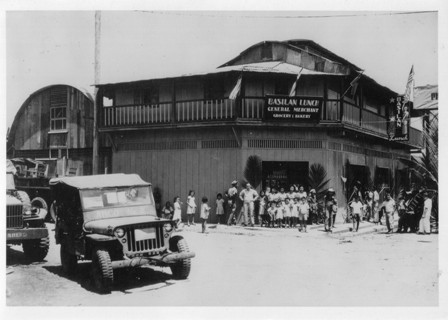
Post-war Basilan City (Isabela)

On 10 March 1945, the U.S. Eighth Army under Lt. Gen. Robert L. Eichelberger was formally ordered by Gen. Douglas MacArthur to clear the rest of Mindanao was supported by the Filipino soldiers of the 6th, 101st and 102nd Infantry Division of the Philippine Commonwealth Army, 10th Constabulary Regiment of the Philippine Constabulary and guerrilla resistance fighters, with the start of Operation VICTOR V, with expectations that the campaign would take four months. Eichelberger had misgivings about the projected timetable for the operation, but nonetheless, his Eighth Army staffers came up with a more effective plan.

On the same day Eichelberger's forces were ordered to invade Mindanao, remnants of Maj. Gen. Jens A. Doe's 41st Infantry Division carried out Operation VICTOR IV, the seizure of Zamboanga, which was concurrent with the recapture of Palawan, dubbed Operation VICTOR III. A sizable force, numbering about 9,000 men of the 54th Japanese Independent Mixed Brigade (IMB), had established strong defensive positions around Zamboanga City at the southern tip of the peninsula.

The slow construction of the airfield at Palawan posed a problem for tactical air support augmenting the Zamboanga operation. The seizure of a makeshift airstrip at Dipolog, about 145 miles (230 km) to the northeast of Zamboanga City, the Americans rapidly exploited the opportunity, airlifting two reinforced companies from the 21st Infantry Regiment, 24th Division to ensure control of the airstrip. Soon thereafter, Marine Aircraft Groups Zamboanga (MAGSZAM) under Col. Clayton C. Jerome was flying sorties off the airstrip to cover naval bombardment and landing preparations off Zamboanga City.

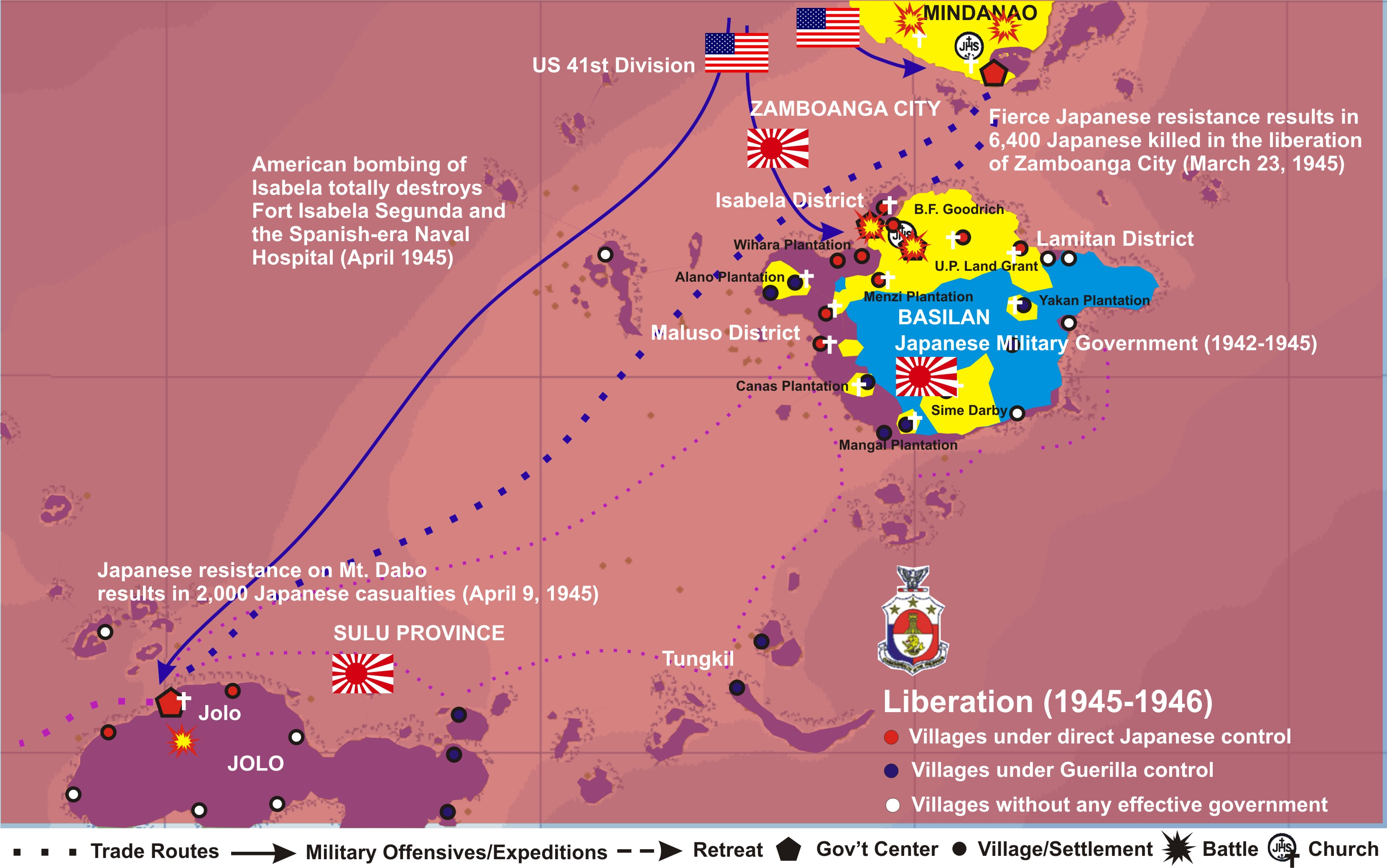

After bombings of the landing areas by the 13th Air Force and a three-day bombardment by the U.S. Navy, the 162nd and 163rd Infantry Regiments landed three miles (5 km) west of Zamboanga City. Japanese opposition to the landings were minimal, and the 41st Division troops quickly captured the city, which was decimated by the pre-invasion bombardments. The next day, 11 March, the Americans and the Filipinos encountered strong resistance when they attacked Japanese positions in the hills, overlooking the coastal plain. For two weeks, U.S. infantry, ably supported by Marine aviation and naval gunfire together with the Philippine Commonwealth Army forces, fought the Japanese along a five-mile (8 km) front, in terrain so rugged that tanks could not be used, and in positions heavily fortified with deep earthen emplacements, barbed wire, minefields, and booby traps.

On 23 March, after heavy fighting, the center of the Japanese line finally broke, and in the next three days, the 162nd Infantry continued eliminating resistance in the central sector. The 186th Infantry, replacing the 163rd, continued the attack and the 54th Japanese IMB was forced to pull out a week later, harried by the Philippine Commonwealth troops & guerrilla units, retreating through the peninsula and into the jungle. After some time, mopping up operations resulted in 220 Americans and 460 Filipinos killed compared with 6,400 Japanese dead.

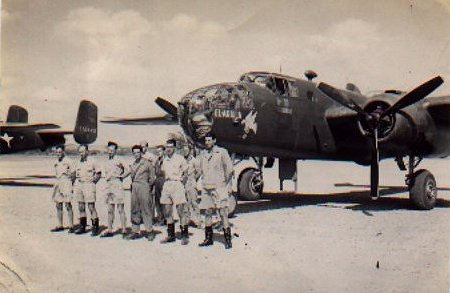
American bomber planes on a Basilan landing field

Alongside the Zamboanga operation, smaller units of the combined soldiers of the Philippine Commonwealth Army's 6th, 101st and 102nd Division and the U.S. Army's 41st Division invaded the Sulu Archipelago, a long stretch of islands reaching from the Zamboanga Peninsula to North Borneo. Rapidly taken in succession were Basilan, Malamawi, Tawi-Tawi, Sanga Sanga and Bongao. It is during this phase of the operations when American bombing raids completely destroyed Fort Isabela Segunda, which was used by the Japanese as military headquarters, prison and munitions dump, and razed the "Spanish" Naval Hospital. Minimal resistance from entrenched Japanese positions in Isabela and Malamawi Island brought about a quick reoccupation which was completed by the beginning of April. On 9 April, strong resistance at Jolo was encountered. Anchoring their stubborn defense around Mount Dabo, some 3,900 Japanese troops held off the U.S. 163rd Infantry supported by Filipino soldiers of the Philippine Commonwealth Army and Philippine Constabulary and other local Moro guerrillas. By 22 April, the Allies took the position after hard fighting and the rest of the troops fled and held out in the west for another two months. The 163rd suffered 40 dead and 125 wounded by mid-June, 1945, while some 2,000 Japanese perished.

== Cityhood under the Republic ==
When the town of Zamboanga became a chartered city in 1936, it included Basilan, which caused many problems due to the long distance between the island and the Mindanao mainland. To solve these problems, on July 1, 1948, by virtue of a bill filed by then Congressman Juan S. Alano, Basilan itself became a separate city after Republic Act. No. 288 was passed by the 1st Philippine Congress, as a component city of Zamboanga.

The first city mayor was Nicasio S. Valderroza, who appointed by President Elpidio Quirino. He was considered a builder of cities, having been variously a Provincial Treasurer, an acting Provincial Governor of the old Province of Zamboanga, Mayor of Baguio City, first Mayor of Zamboanga City, First Mayor of Davao City and the first appointed Mayor of the new City of Basilan until 1953. When President Ramon Magsaysay became the Chief Executive of the republic in Rizal Day 1953, he appointed Leroy S. Brown as mayor of Basilan City. He served as the second and the last appointive mayor of this city until December 31, 1955. The city was then classified as a first class city as part of the province of Zamboanga del Sur.

With the approval of Republic Act. No. 1211 amending the charter of the City of Basilan, the position of the City Mayor became elective.

The first election for local officials in Basilan was held on November 8, 1955. Mayor Brown was overwhelmingly elected as the first elective mayor of the city. He was responsible for the construction of several concrete bridges, notably the Aguada Bridge and the impressive Balagtasan Bridge in Lamitan, as well as the construction of a number of public buildings, the expansion of the Isabela wharf, and many more, all of which greatly benefited the people of Basilan.

He was the first and the last elected city executive of Basilan. He served uninterrupted from January 1954 to December 31, 1975, under the Administrations of Presidents Carlos Garcia, Diosdado Macapagal and Ferdinand Marcos. During his term, the city council gave birth to a new breed of legislators and leaders from 1954 to 1975. These years have since been called Basilan's "Golden Years".

Moreover, Mayor Brown was a stalwart member of the Philippines' oldest political party - the Nacionalista Party (NP) - having been elevated to the 7-man Ruling Junta of the NP until the party's suppression by former NP-party-man-turned-nemesis Ferdinand Marcos' Martial Law government.

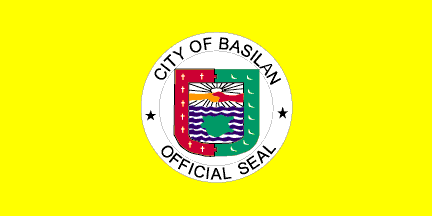

=== City of Basilan ===
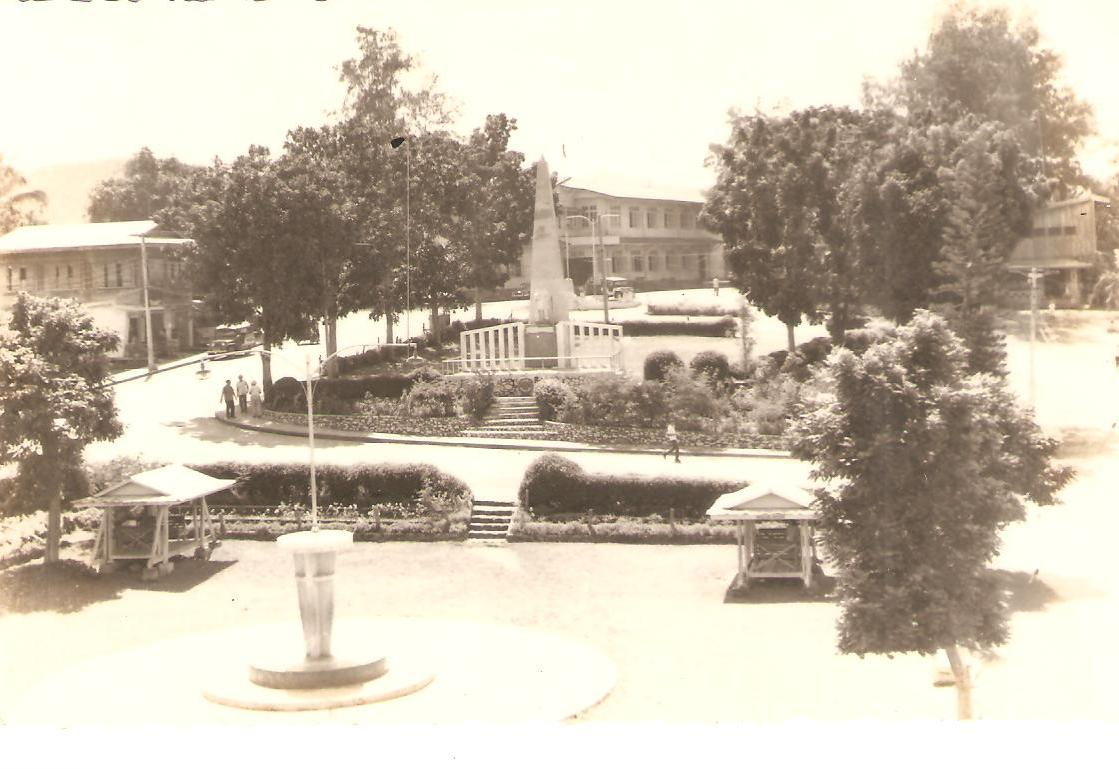
Downtown Isabela, old Plaza Rizal and Plaza Misericordia.

- Mayor NICASIO S. VALDERROZA (Appointed, 1948–1953)

Mayor: Nicasio S. Valderroza

Councilors:

1. Filoteo Dianala Jo, Chairman of the City Council
2. Rupino Diaz
3. Pedro Cuevas Jr.
4. Teofilo Saavedra
5. Jose Pamaran
6. Marcelino Navarro
7. Leroy S. Brown
- Mayor LEROY S. BROWN, 1st Term (Appointed, 1954–1955)

Mayor: Leroy S. Brown

Vice Mayor: Exequiel Dayot, Sr.

Councilors:

1. Pedro Fernandez
2. Jaabil Abdulaup
3. Rupino Diaz
4. Pedro Cuevas Jr.
5. Teofilo Saavedra
6. Jose Pamaran
7. Marcellano Navarro

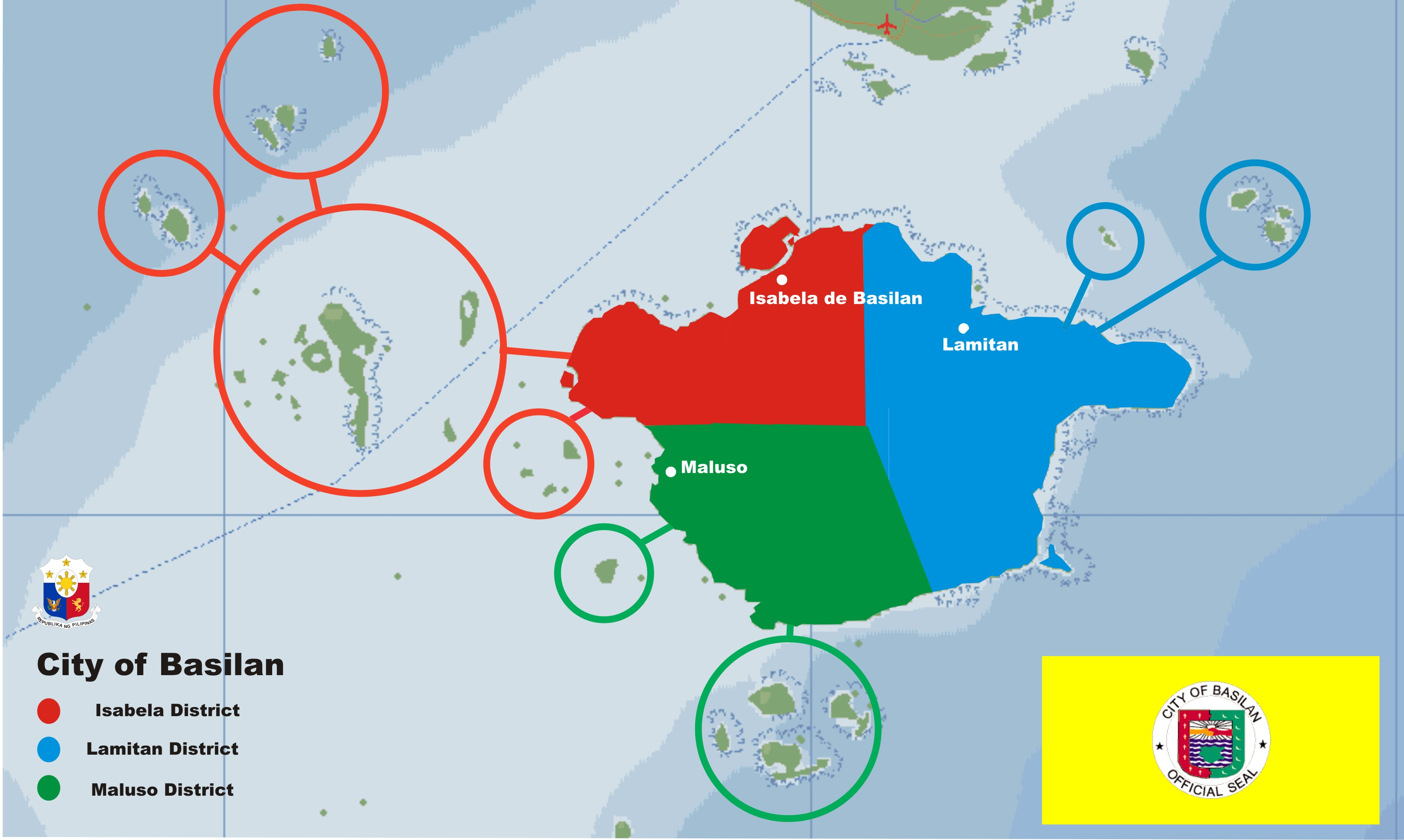
Basilan City Districts (1948–75)

- Mayor LEROY S. BROWN, 2nd Term (Elected, 1955–1959)

Mayor: Leroy S. Brown

Vice Mayor: Jose Legaspi

Councilors:

1. Pedro Pamaran

2. Jaabil Abdulaup

3. Exequiel Dayot, Jr.

4. Carlos Valdez

5. Epifanio Anoos

6. Segundino Mariano

7. Jose Segundo Martinez

8. Pedro Fernandez

- Mayor LEROY S. BROWN, 3rd Term (1959–1963)

Mayor: Leroy S. Brown

Vice Mayor: Exequiel Dayot, Sr.

Councilors:

1. Jose Legaspi

2. Asan Camlian

3. Mohammad Edris

4. Purificacion Arquiza

5. Atty. Ricardo G. Mon

6. Loyola Gadayan

7. Jesus Tabilon

8. Pedro Pamaran

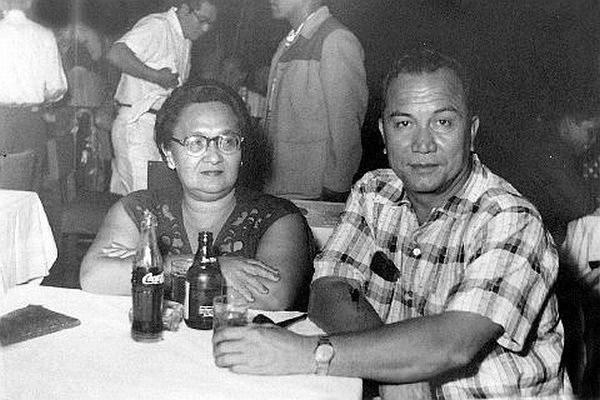
Mayor Leroy S. Brown and wife Felisa

- Mayor LEROY S. BROWN, 4th Term (1963–1967)

Mayor: Leroy S. Brown

Vice Mayor: Exequiel Dayot Sr.

Councilors:

1. Purificacion Arquiza

2. Atty. Ricardo G. Mon

3. Mohammad Edris

4. Asan G. Camlian

5. Loyola Gadayan

6. Cirilo Garcia

7. Jose Legaspi

8. Elegio Yabyabin

- Mayor LEROY S. BROWN, 5th Term (1967–1971)

Mayor: Leroy S. Brown

Vice Mayor: Exequiel Dayot Jr.

Councilors:

1. Purificacion Arquiza

2. Ricardo G. Mon

3. Asan G.Camlian

4. Jose legaspi

5. Wilfredo Furigay

6. Jesus Tabilon

7. Mohammad Edris

8. Boy Garcia

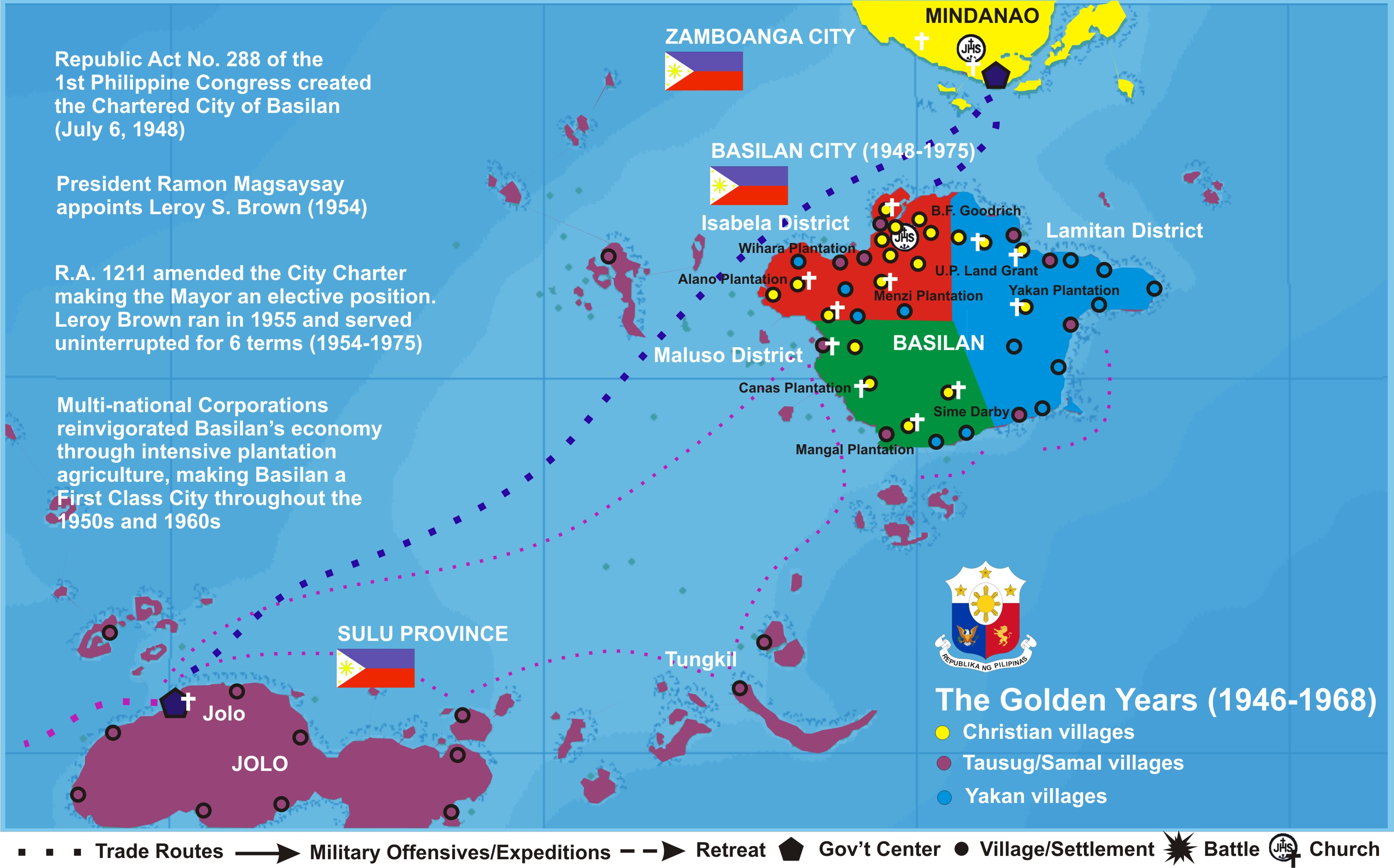

- Mayor LEROY S. BROWN, 6th Term (1971–1975)

Mayor : Leroy S. Brown

Vice Mayor : Pedro Pamaran

Councilors :

1. Asan G. Camlian

2. Ulbert Ulama Tugung

3. Cecilio Martin

4. Boy Garcia

5. Wilfredo Furigay

6. Purificacion Arquiza

7. Ricardo G. Mon

8. Ramon Barandino

== Conversion to provincial status ==
=== Martial Law years - birth of a new province ===
On September 21, 1972, President Ferdinand E. Marcos declared Martial Law. At that time, the then island city was in the middle of the Moro National Liberation Front Uprising prompted by the expose of the Jabidah Massacre on March 18, 1968. A number of native Moro leaders joined the MNLF rebellion, making Basilan a veritable warzone. The first-ever armed confrontation occurred around the heavily forested hills of Bagbagon and Canibungan in Lantawan on the island's western area. This was followed by the occupation of the Alano Plantation (declared "No Man's Land" by the military) by MNLF "munduhin" and "blackshirts" and the ensuing aerial bombardment by the military which burned down and left the Anoos Ancestral house, the Anoos ranch and its vast coconut, rubber and coffee plantations in Tuburan totally devastated. MNLF rebels then laid siege over Lamitan's poblacion, but was eventually staved off by fierce resistance from Lamitan residents who volunteered to fight valiantly beside elements of the Armed Forces and the Philippine Constabulary.

Several more raids and ambushes were made throughout the island, which succeeded in stopping all the operations of the plantations. Sporadic gun-battles, too, broke out within Isabela's poblacion, and pirate raids harried fishing operations as well as passenger ferry traffic between Basilan and Zamboanga.

After more than two years of incessant fighting, a substantial number among Basilan's Christian populace left the place altogether reducing the Christian tribes to minority status once again. After nearly 50 years of continuous immigration from Zamboanga, the Visayas and Luzon, Basilan experienced, for the very first time, a net outflow of people.

On December 27, 1973, President Marcos issued Presidential Decree No. 356, converting the City of Basilan into the Province of Basilan "to provide the close government attention and for the purpose of spurring its growth". The first appointed Provincial Officials took their oath of office on March 7, 1974, making this day the official Founding Anniversary of the province. Another Presidential Decree numbered 593 dated December 2, 1974, amended P.D. 356. The law not only defines the City's territory but also provided that the capital of Basilan shall be the Municipality of Isabela, one of 10 towns created for the new province.

Presidential Decree No. 593 was later amended by Presidential Decree No. 840 dated December 11, 1975, reducing the number of municipalities to seven (7) in order to render its "territorial portion more complementary to the size of the area and more responsive to pacification, rehabilitation and total development of the province". The municipalities specified in the said amendment were the following: Isabela, Lamitan, Tuburan, Tipo-Tipo, Sumisip, Maluso and Lantawan, of which five (5) municipalities are now in existence. It also provided for the absorption of the territorial jurisdiction of the City of Basilan into the Municipality of Isabela with its poblacion as the capital seat of the province.

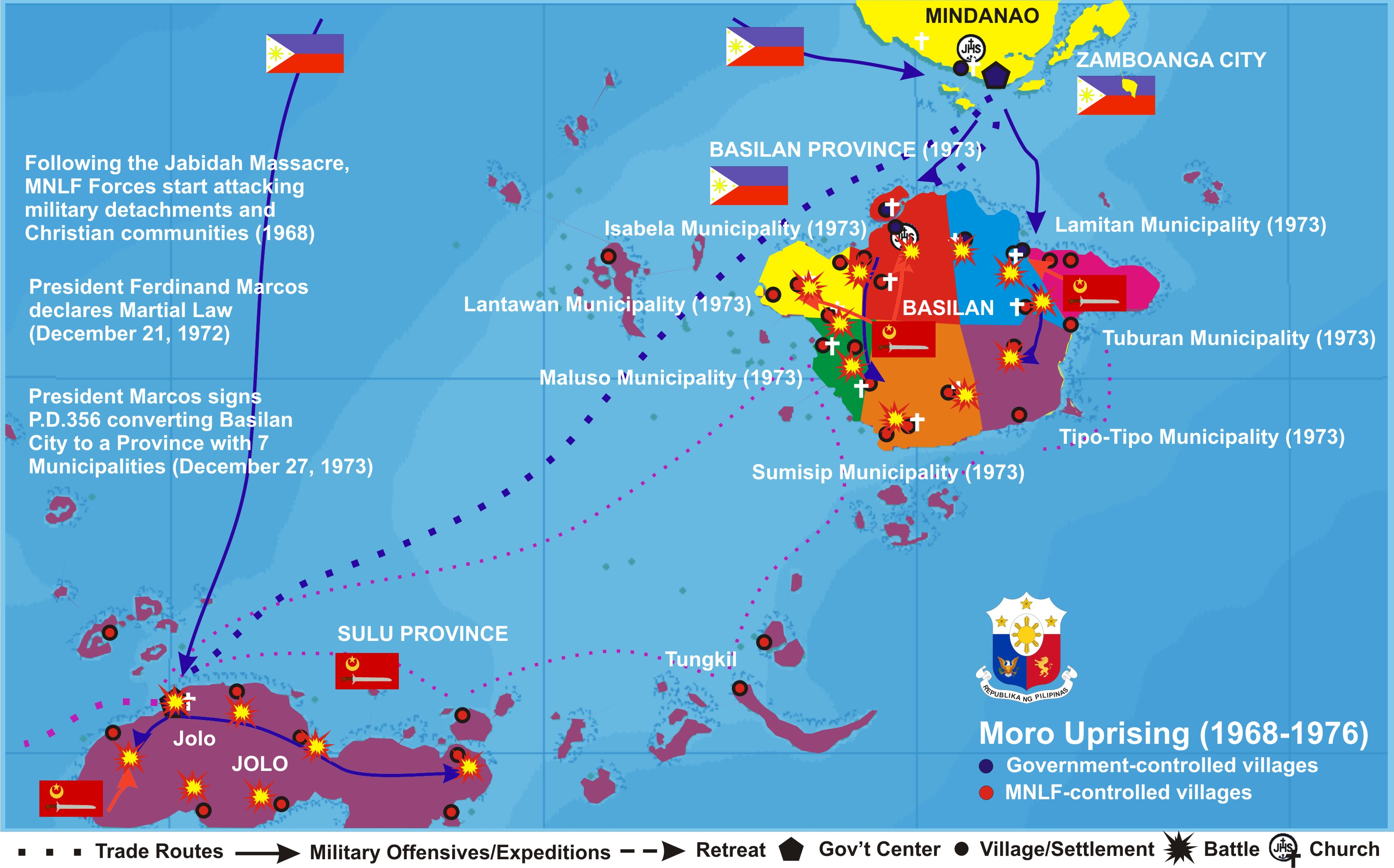

The conversion to Province-hood, and the creation of Municipalities ensured that Basilan's sparsely populated areas were "given" to Muslim warlords and surrendering MNLF Commanders by Presidential fiat, as a form of bounty or reward for laying down their arms. The once-progressive First-Class City of Basilan was emasculated beyond recognition, having been reduced to an area exactly One-Kilometer radius within the Isabela Poblacion.[Source?]

Under Martial Law, Basilan had its first military governor in the person of Col. Tomas G. Nanquil, Jr., then the Brigade Commander of 24th Infantry Brigade stationed in Basilan. There were three (3) Vice-governors during his one-year and half term as military governor.

Before Basilan was converted to a province, it had three regular municipalities, Isabela, Lamitan, and Maluso which were districts of the city of Basilan. Even when Col. Nanquil was appointed Military Governor, the city of Basilan was still functioning under Mayor Brown until December 31, 1975, due to its territorial boundary dispute with the Province of Basilan.

The second military Governor was Rear Admiral Romulo M. Espaldon. Due to his numerous functions and responsibilities as Commanding General of the Armed Forces of the Philippines (AFP) Southern Command (SOUTHCOM), Deputy Chief of Staff of the AFP, and Regional Commissioner of Region IX, and Governor of Tawi-Tawi Province, Admiral Espaldon designated Col. Florencio Magsino, Brigade Commander of the 21st Infantry Brigade, as Military Supervisor for Basilan and Officer-In-Charge. His Deputy Brigade Commander Col. Recaredo Calvo ably assisted Col. Magsino. When Col. Magsino was appointed Superintendent of the Philippine Military Academy (PMA) in Baguio City and Col. Calvo was recalled to Headquarters, Col. Alfredo Rillera assumed command of the Brigade and became the Military Supervisor of Basilan. He was succeeded by Col. Salvador Mison. Col. Augusto Narag, Jr., later replaced him. The last military Supervisor was Gen. Rodolfo Tolentino, consequently, the first military with a star rank to be appointed Military Supervisor in Basilan. Admiral Espaldon was the last military governor of the province, his term lasted until December 31, 1975.

On December 11, 1975, President Marcos appointed then Vice-Governor for Administration Asan G. Camlian, a thrice-elected City Councilor.

Together with Gov. Asan G. Camlian, the first mayors of the seven municipalities were also appointed. These mayors were Ricardo G. Mon from Isabela; Pedro C. Pamaran, Lamitan; Jean S. Yasin, Maluso; Herman H. Hatalan, Sumisip; Muhtamad S. Akbar, Lantawan, Candu I. Muarip, Tuburan; and Abduca Osani, Tipo-Tipo.

Thus, on New Year's Day 1976, Basilan was transformed into a province of the Republic.

=== Post-Martial Law era ===
In the local elections held on January 30, 1980, and running under the banner of Marcos-led Kilusang Bagong Lipunan (KBL or New Society Movement), a huge majority elected Gov. Camlian. He served for ten (10) years (1976–1986).

The first representative of the Federation of the ABC in the SP was Yusan A. Ismael while Sahak Habil represented the KB after Nasser Mustafa.

The representative of the Province in the Batasang Pambansa was Kalbi T. Tupay, a former MNLF Commander who was among the first to return to the folds of the law. In the second election after martial law, however, he lost to a native son of Basilan, Candu I. Muarip, the first and last Yakan to serve as Assemblyman in the Batasang Pambansa until its abolition in 1986; the first and only Basileno to get a Cabinet Portfolio when he served as Secretary of the Office of Muslim Affairs and Cultural Communities (OMACC) from 1986 to 1987 under the Administration of Corazon C. Aquino; and the first Yakan Congressman to represent Basilan Province in the House of Representatives (1995–1998).

In 1984, Basilan had three (3) representatives in the Autonomous Government of Region IX; namely; Ulbert Ulama Tugung, Chairman, LTP, Sagga H. Ismael and Hudan Abubakar.

Elnorita Pamaran Tugung widow of assassinated LTP Chairman Ulbert Ulama Tugung became Chairman of the Lupong Tagapagpaganap ng Pook and later represented Basilan in the House of Representatives (1992–1995) after the term of Cong. Alvin G. Dans who served from 1987 to 1992.

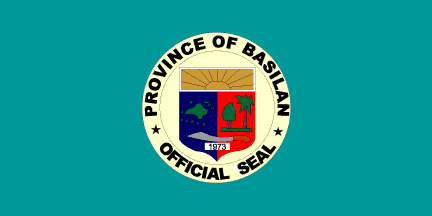

=== Officials during the Marcos presidency ===
The composition of the appointed Martial Law Military Administration were the following:

- MILITARY ADMINISTRATION (Appointed, 1974–1975)

1st Military Governor : Col. Tomas Nanquil Jr.

2nd Military Governor : Rear Adm. Romulo Espaldon

Military Supervisors under Rear Adm. Romulo Espaldon :

- Col. Florencio Magsino
- Col. Alfredo Rillera
- Col. Salvador Mison
- Col. Augusto Narag, Jr.
- Gen. Rodolfo Tolentino

Provincial Board:

- Vice Governor for Administration : Asan Camlian
- Vice-Governor for Peace and Order : Kalbi i. Tupay
- Vice-Governor for Development : Mohammad P. Edris

Provincial Board Members :

1. Pedro C. Cuevas
2. Ulbert Ulama Tugung
3. Jean S. Yasin
4. Mario M. Mamang
5. Pio B. Dumadaug
6. Romulo Lopez

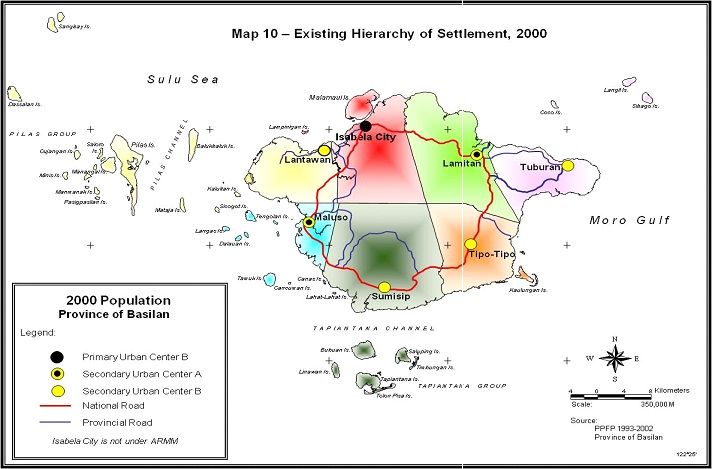
Basilan Political Map (1975–2001)

The composition of the first Provincial Administration under a civilian governor were:

- Gov. ASAN G. CAMLIAN, 1st Term (Appointed, 1975–1980)

Governor : Asan G. Camlian Vice Governor : Pedro Pamaran

Provincial Board Members

1. Mario M. Mamang

2. Sagga H. Ismael

3. Avelino K. Ilimin

4. Roberto A. Anoos

5. Kalbi I. Tupay

6. Lahe M. Atalad

7. Inoy D. Osamad

8. Ricardo N. Nualia

9. Pio B. Dumadaug

10. Aurea B. Maulod

The first elected Provincial Officials were:

- Gov. ASAN G. CAMLIAN, 2nd Term (Elected, 1980–1986)

Governor : Asan G. Camlian

Vice Governor : Pedro Pamaran

Provincial Board Members

1. Atty. Antonio S. Alano

2. Roberto Anoos

3. Mario M. Mamang

4. Inoy D. Osamad

5. Lahe Atalad

6. Isabel K. Gahapon

7. Muhammadnur Hassan, ABC

8. Nasser Mustafa, KB

=== People power ===
The snap presidential election of February 7, 1986, followed by the famous and historic EDSA People Power Revolution toppled President Marcos and installed President Aquino to power. The Batasang Pambansa was abolished and all local officials were replaced. President Aquino appointed Louis W. Alano, grandson of Cong. Juan S. Alano, and Basilan's Lead Convenor of the Concerned Citizens' Aggrupation (CCA) founded by the late Zamboanga City Mayor, and staunch Marcos Oppositionist, Cesar C. Climaco, as interim governor of Basilan together with Vice-Governor Ping A. Kasim, the members of the Provincial Board, the mayors of the seven municipalities and all municipal councilors in the province. This was preparatory to the local elections in 1988.

Prior to the appointment of Gov. Alano, the Department of Interior and Local Government installed government Operations Officer Pepito Pamolana as Officer-In-Charge of the province, through it lasted for only 2 hours. When the local officials filed their candidacy for the 1988 elections, Poe Reynera and Hji. Calama Ibama served as Governor and Vice-Governor respectively. The Board Members appointed with them were: Isidro A. Sta. Elena, Abdulgani Ismael, Ust. Abdulla Baja, Hassan Hajiri, Mario Cabanlit and Romeo Belocura.

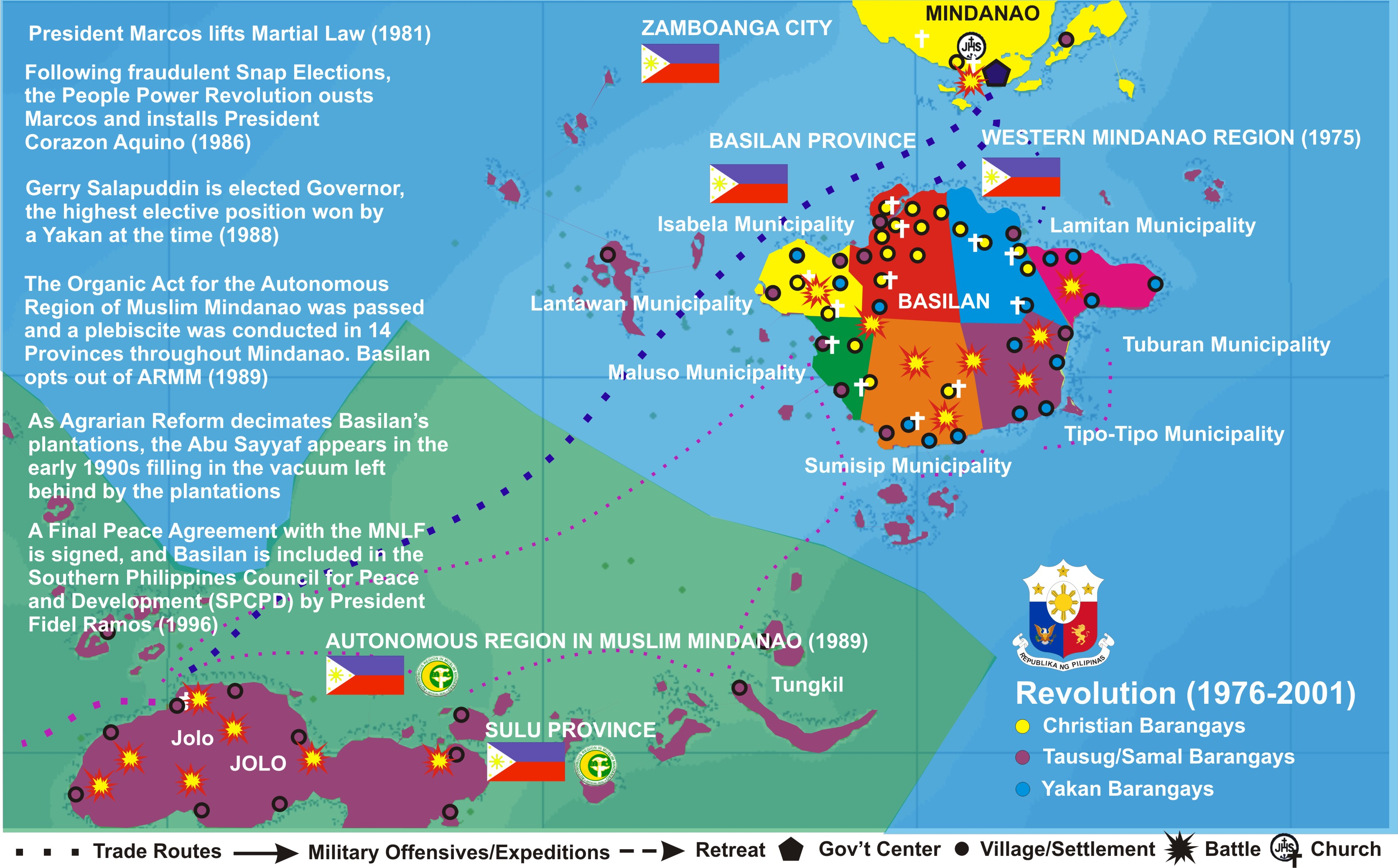

The Provincial Officials under Gov. Alano were:

- PEOPLE POWER REVOLUTIONARY GOVERNMENT (Appointed, 1986–1988)

Governor: Louis W. Alano

Vice Governor: Ping A. Kasim

Provincial Board Members:

1. Abdulgapor Abubakar

2. Harisul T. Samanul

3. Miskuddin Tupay

4. Abdurahman U. Sahi

5. Antonio Enriquez

6. Cecilio Martin

7. Muhammadnur Hassan, ABC

8. Yusoph Sali, Youth

Gov. Abdulgani "Gerry" Salapuddin won the elections on February 2, 1988. He was the first Provincial Governor from the Yakan tribe and served for three consecutive terms, from 1988 to 1998.

The Administration of Gov. Salapuddin started the re-construction of the Provincial Capitol Building (burned on June 6, 1993), supported trade missions to neighboring countries, established joint peace and order development councils, improved and rehabilitated major road networks, offered medical and financial assistance to the needy, loan assistance and livelihood program to new entrepreneurs and cooperatives, employees amelioration and welfare.

He likewise served as representative of the Lone District of Basilan in the House of Representatives, for three consecutive terms, during his second term, he became the First Yakan representative to become Deputy Speaker for Mindanao in the Philippine Congress' Lower House during the 12th Congress, he was returned as Deputy Speaker for Mindanao on his third and last term as Representative in the 13th Congress.

=== The rise of the Abu Sayyaf ===
The Abu Sayyaf Group (Arabic: جماعة أبو سياف; Jamāʿah Abū Sayyāf, ASG; Tagalog: Grupong Abu Sayyaf), also known as al-Harakat al-Islamiyya

In the decades following the establishment of Basilan City, the island's interior was effectively secured from attacks of all kinds by the multi-national plantations and its complement of well-equipped security personnel. This, plus the centralization of authority in Isabela, assured a steady and uninterrupted development of Basilan's countryside.

In the early part of the 1990s, however, the government's implementation of the Comprehensive Agrarian Reform Program (CARP) brought widespread confusion and severely affected Basilan's traditional plantation agriculture economy. The withdrawal of the multi-national plantations was quickly followed by the decommissioning of their respective security contingents. The Christian-Tausug communities within the plantations were left out on their own, ripe for an attack from their traditionally hostile Yakan neighbors previously held at bay by the presence of security forces paid for by the plantations. Basilan's Christian-Tausug plantation communities had to fend for themselves, depending on agrarian reform cooperatives with limited resources to quell any serious threat on their newly acquired properties.

This threat did not take long in making itself known. The establishment of a group of young, Syrian-, Afghan- and Libyan-trained Filipino mujahideen - the Al-Harakatul Al-Islamiyah, better known as the bandit group Abu Sayyaf - founded by Yakan firebrand Abdurajak Janjalani, a Yakan-Ilonggo, allegedly assisted by a preacher-classmate in his years of training in Syria and Afghanistan, Wahab Akbar, soon catapulted Basilan to international notoriety as a haven for terrorists.

This band of brigands stormed Ipil town in Zamboanga Sibugay Province in April 1995 and planted a bomb on American Library ship M/V Doulos, docked in Zamboanga's port. On the same year, Janjalani's younger brother, Khadaffy, escaped from a Manila prison. From then on, Abdurajak was said to be grooming his brother to be his successor, Khadaffy Janjalani.

On December 18, 1998, Abdurajak Janjalani was eventually tracked down and killed in a Lamitan hideout. The group then went into hiding as Khadaffy, Janjalani's brother and anointed heir-apparent, consolidated his control over the many different groups that composed the Abu Sayyaf then. Assisted by Abu Sabaya in Basilan and Commander Robot in Sulu, both of whom are Tausug, Khadaffy soon revived the group - this time receiving hefty funding from international terror networks Al Qaeda and Jemaah Islamiyah.

They then engineered a series of arguably successful kidnap-for-ransom operations which reached its fever point in 2000 and 2001, when high-profile hostages from Malaysia's resort island of Sipadan and then tourists from a Palawan resort were kidnapped and brought to Basilan and Sulu. This episode saw the killing of American Muslim Jeffrey Schilling and Christian Missionary Martin Burnham. His wife, Gracia Burnham, was eventually rescued. The town proper of Lamitan was likewise attacked by the group, briefly occupying the Jose Ma. Torres Hospital and the St. Peter Parish, and then escaping a supposedly tight military-police dragnet under a cloud of accusations and allegations of payments and collusion on the part of military officials and their Abu Sayyaf counterparts.

For a time, the entire Basilan island was blockaded off by Philippine Navy ships, in an effort to contain the group, and prevent any further traffic between Zamboanga, Basilan and the rest of the Sulu Archipelago. This, too, however, proved futile.

This prompted the government, assisted by the United States under President George W. Bush, to inaugurate Balikatan 02-1 Joint US-RP Training in 2002, wherein a contingent of about 3,000 US troops were deployed in Basilan to offer training and technical assistance to the Philippine Armed Forces, as well as humanitarian services to the general populace.

This then led to an avalanche of NGOs and ODA-funded projects which aimed to transform Basilan from the Philippines' "Wild, Wild West" to a showcase for US/foreign-assisted efforts in former terrorist hotbeds, dubbed the "Basilan Model". ODA-funded initiatives from Canada, Australia, New Zealand, EU, UK, Belgium, Japan, Germany and Spain complemented the larger US presence in the area.

To date, the Abu Sayyaf, has continued on its kidnapping rampage, killing off 14 personnel of the Philippine Marines in an ambush on July 11, 2007. It has likewise carried out several high-profile kidnappings, all of which were on Sulu island, including ABSCBN Reporter Ces Drilon (June 8, 2008), GMA7's Susan Enriquez (April 2000) and Carlo Lorenzo (September 2002), controversial reporter Arlyn dela Cruz (January 2002, believed to have had a "special relationship" with Khadaffy), as well as a number of foreign journalists from Germany (Der Spiegel), France, Australia and Denmark. Its latest exploit is the kidnapping of 3 high-level staff workers of the International Committee of the Red Cross or ICRC (1 Filipino, 1 Swiss and 1 Italian), also in Sulu.

In July 2004, Gracia Burnham testified at a trial of eight Abu Sayyaf member and identified six out of the suspects as being her erstwhile captors, including Alhamzer Limbong alias Kosovo, Abdul Azan Diamla, Abu Khari Moctar, Bas Ishmael, Alzen Jandul and Dazid Baize.

"The eight suspects sat silently during her three-hour testimony, separated from her by a wooden grill. They face the death sentence if found guilty of kidnapping for ransom. The trial began this year and is not expected to end for several months."

Alhamzer Limbong was later killed in a prison uprising.

Gracia Burnham has caused controversy since returning to the US, by claiming that Philippine military officials were colluding with her captors. She made the claim in a book about her experiences called In the Presence of My Enemies. In it she complains the Armed Forces of the Philippines "didn't pursue us ... "As time went on, we noticed that they never pursued us."

A series of kidnappings and beheadings since 2007 have been attributed to the Abu Sayyaf Group, with some of its members having been given the distinction of having US$5 million (some of them US$30 million) placed on their heads as monetary rewards by the U.S. Government for their capture.

The most recent kidnapping spree involved two Chinese-migrant businessmen and their Filipino employee (who was eventually beheaded) in Maluso, and businessman Lario delos Santos who was abducted from his Isabela City resort December 16, 2010. Allegations of the proliferation of "absentee executives" in Basilan's hinterland municipalities have been blamed for the steep rise in the spate of kidnap-for-ransom cases. Likewise, rumors about military-police collusion with the kidnappers, as well as a worsening narcotics-prohibited drugs trade in the province have been pointed at as possible causes for the recent lawlessness in the province.

The Provincial Officials from 1988 to 1998 were:

- Gov. GERRY A. SALAPUDDIN, 1st Term (Elected, 1988–1992)

Governor : Gerry A. Salapuddin

Vice Governor: Ping A. Kasim, P.O. pro tempore

Provincial Board Members

1. Hunasil A. Asmawil

2. Mario M. Mamang

3. Ahmad U. Puyo

4. Abdulgapor A. Abubakar

5. Adam A. Musa, SK

6. Andriel B. Asalul, ABC

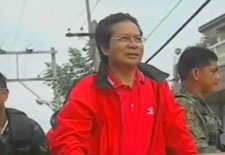
Abdulgani "Gerry" A. Salapuddin, 3-term Governor and 3-term Congressman, also served as Deputy Speaker of the House of Representatives on his last 2-terms as Representative of the Lone District of Basilan

- Gov. GERRY A. SALAPUDDIN, 2nd Term (1992–1995)

Governor : Gerry A. Salapuddin

Vice Governor : Ping A. Kasim

Provincial Board Members

1. Mario M. Mamang

2. Nato Asmawil

3. Eddie Otoh Fernandez

4. Perfecto C. Antonio

5. Susan B. Yu

6. Alexander V. Estabillo

7. Miskuddin S. Tupay

8. Nasser A. Edris, ABC

9. Nasser A. Salain, SK

- Gov. GERRY A. SALAPUDDIN, 3rd Term (1995–1998)

Governor : Gerry A. Salapuddin

Vice Governor : Ping A. Kasim

Provincial Board Members

1ST DISTRICT BOARD MEMBER

1. Susan B. Yu

2. Sakiran Hajan

3. Miskuddin S. Tupay

2ND DISTRICT BOARD MEMBER

4. Andriel B. Asalul

5. Mohammad B. Abdullah

6. Bonnie C. Balamo

7. Alih Salih, ABC

8. Alton T. Angeles, Councilors' League

9. Nasser A. Salain, SK

=== Days of Dynasty ===
Republic Act. 7160 known as the Local Government Code of 1992 gave the Vice-Governor the power to become the Presiding Officer of the Sanggunian Panlalawigan, thereby separating the Executive function of the Governor and Legislative power of the Provincial Board headed by the Vice-Governor.

Vice Governor Ping A. Kasim served uninterrupted from 1986 to 1998. Otoh Fernandez, Perfecto C. Antonio, Jr., Andriel B. Asalul, and Nato Asmawil were the longest serving members of the board.

Former Congressman Alvin G. Dans served for two (2) months as Governor in the later part of 1996 after the Commission on Elections declared him the winner in the gubernatorial race of 1992.

Another interim governor, former Vice Governor Ping A. Kasim served for three (3) months as Chief Executive. He served in this capacity from April to June 1998.

Gov. Wahab M. Akbar assumed office on July 1, 1998. His first term was highlighted by his close affiliation with President Joseph Estrada, he switched sides during the 2001 EDSA People Power Revolution which ousted president Estrada and installed vice president Gloria Macapagal-Arroyo as the new president. During Akbar's administration various projects for Communication and Health Services, the Full implementation of the Salary Standardization Law, Infrastructure Projects, Food Security Programs and Peace and Order Programs in the province were made. The re-construction of the Provincial Capitol was likewise completed during his term.

Recent developments brought about by the inclusion of Basilan into the Autonomous Region in Muslim Mindanao(ARMM)increased the number of Basilan's Municipalities to eleven (11), namely the original: Maluso, Lantawan, Sumisip, Tipo-Tipo, Tuburan, and the ARMM-created Al-Barka, Akbar, Muhammad Ajul, Ungkaya Pukan, Hdji. Muhtamad and Tabuan Lasa, municipalities with an average of only 10 Barangays each and populations that increduously grew by an average 100% over the period of only seven years.

Case in point is the eponymous Akbar Municipality (named after the late Congressman Wahab Akbar, during his lifetime), which used to have a population of only 10,581 in 9 barangays in 2000, to 21,312 in 2007, or an actual population increase of 101.42%.

On April 25, 2001, by virtue of Republic Act. No. 9023, sponsored by Dep. Speaker Gerry Salapuddin, the people of Isabela, through a plebiscite, overwhelmingly ratified the conversion of the Capital Town of Isabela into a Component City.

=== Into the Autonomous Region in Muslim Mindanao ===
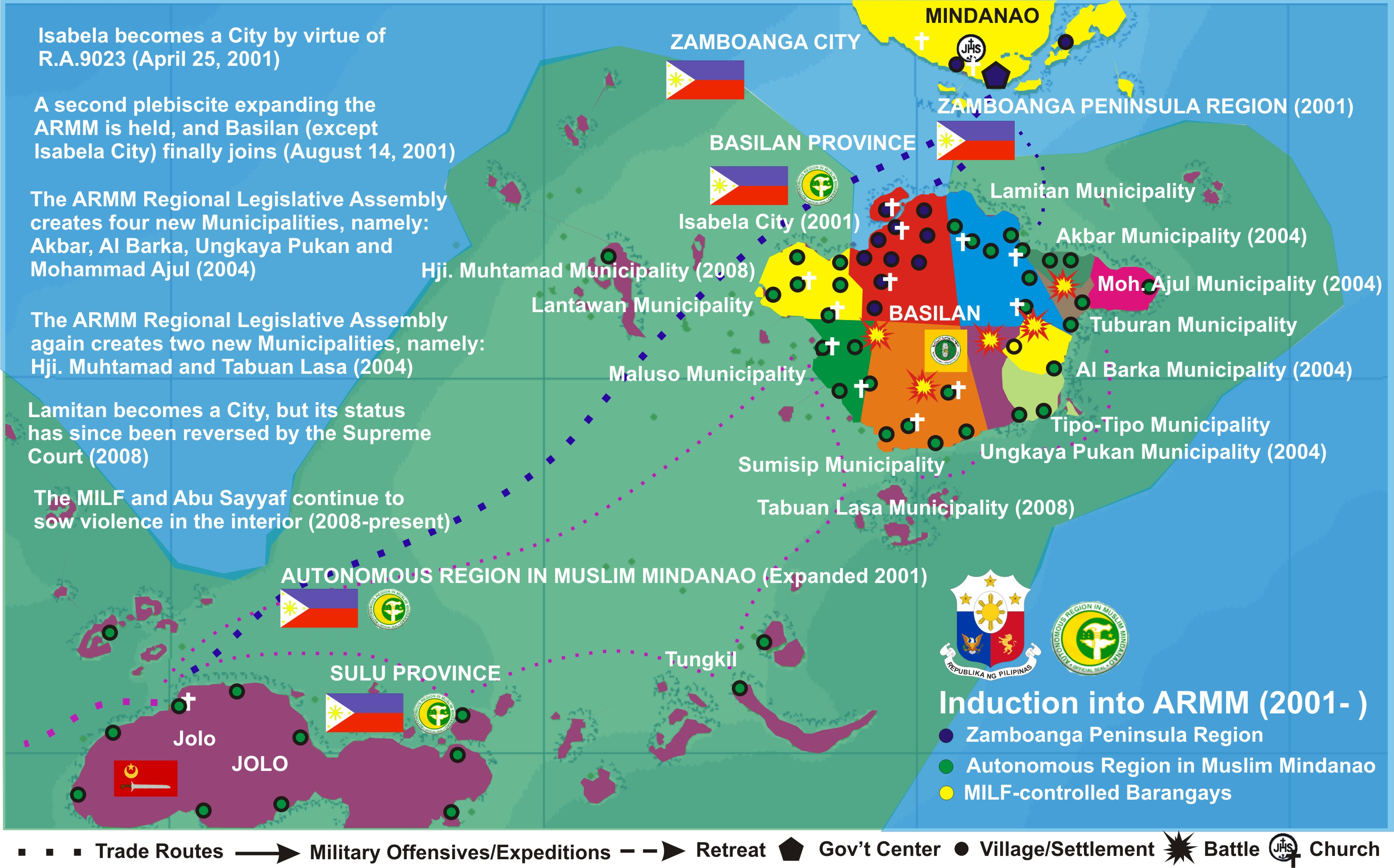

On August 14, 2001, a majority of the voters in the Municipalities Lantawan, Maluso, Sumisip, Tipo-Tipo and Tuburan opted to join the Autonomous Region in Muslim Mindanao in a plebiscite expanding the territory of the Autonomous Region. Isabela City and Lamitan Municipality voted against inclusion. Nevertheless, all of Basilan's municipalities (including Lamitan) have been enrolled as a part of the expanded ARMM. Isabela City alone was placed under the regional jurisdiction of Zamboanga Peninsula.

In the ARMM election of November 26, 2001, Rajam Akbar, Hatimil Hassan, Harisul T. Samanul won as Assemblymen representing the province in the ARMM Regional Assembly.

Results from the recent 2007 Local Elections had the COMELEC declaring former Governor Wahab Akbar, an acknowledged Yakan leader, as Congressman of the Lone District of Basilan, a position he served until November 14, 2007, when he was killed by a bomb blast at the Philippine Congress grounds. His first wife, Jum Jainuddin-Akbar was proclaimed Governor, and his second wife, Cherrylyn Santos-Akbar, was proclaimed Mayor of Isabela City. Allegations of massive, systematic and comprehensive electoral fraud, vote-buying and voter intimidation were leveled at the Akbar dynasty. Akbar's nephews and nieces also won the chief posts in almost all municipalities. The only exception being Lamitan, having elected a descendant of the feisty Datu Kalun - Roderick C. Furigay, defeating Akbars third wife in the 2007 elections by a landslide.

Former MNLF Commander and Deputy Speaker of the House of Representatives Abdulgani 'Gerry' Salapuddin, along with Akbar foes Hajiman Hataman and his brother, Party-list Representative Mujiv Hataman have been implicated in the bombing incident which killed their political nemesis.

The Provincial Officials from 1998 to 2010 were:

- Gov. WAHAB M. AKBAR, 1st Term (1998–2001)

Governor: Wahab M. Akbar

Vice Governor: Bonnie C. Balamo

Provincial Board Members:

1ST DISTRICT BOARD MEMBERS

1. Eddie Otoh Fernandez

2. Susan B. Yu

3. Perfecto C. Antonio Jr.

4. Gregorio V. Dela Pena

2ND DISTRICT BOARD MEMBERS

5. Recardo Boga

6. Jubaira Said

7. Hunasil Asmawil

8. Andriel B. Asalul

9. Hussein Francisco, ABC

10. Edwin J. Iklaman, Councilors' League

11. Moumar Muarip, SK

- Gov. WAHAB M. AKBAR, 2nd Term (2001–2004)

Governor : Wahab M. Akbar

Vice Governor : Lukman A. Ampao

Provincial Board Members

1ST DISTRICT BOARD MEMBERS

1. Susan B. Yu

2. Eddie Otoh Fernandez

3. Perfecto C. Antonio Jr.

4. Jainal Ajibon

2ND DISTRICT BOARD MEMBERS

5. Nasser A. Salain

6. Jubaira S. Said

7. Noel Baul

8. Abdulmuhmin Mujahid

9. Majang Linggisan, ABC

10. Ronnie Hantian, Councilors' League

11. Jhomar Maturan, SK

- Gov. WAHAB M. AKBAR, 3rd Term (2004–2007)

Governor : Wahab M.Akbar

Vice Governor : Al-Rasheed Ahmad Sakkalahul

Provincial Board Members

1ST DISTRICT BOARD MEMBERS

1. Eddie Otoh Fernandez

2. Muamar L. Muarip

3. Taib Alejo

4. Placido S. Jilhani

2ND DISTRICT BOARD MEMBERS

5. Alton T. Angeles

6. Abdulmuhmin Mujahid

7. Ronnie A. Hantian

8. Jubaira Said

9. Majang Linggisan, ABC

10. Jhomar Maturan, SK

- Gov. JUM J. AKBAR, 1st Term (2007–2010)

Governor: Jum Jainuddin-Akbar

Vice Governor: Al-Rasheed Sakkalahul

Provincial Board Members:

1ST DISTRICT BOARD MEMBERS

1. Yusop Alano

2. Candu Muarip

3. Placido Jilhani

4. Miskuddin Tupay

2ND DISTRICT BOARD MEMBERS

5. Ronnie Hantian

6. Tahajid Latip

7. Munap Pacio

8. Nasser Salain

9. Reybert Santos. ABC

10. Aley Ahmad Fernandez, SK

11. Edwin Iklaman, PCL

== Representation in the Philippine Congress ==
The lone Congressional District of Basilan is the representation of the Province of Basilan in the Philippine House of Representatives. Basilan was part of the representation of the Department of Mindanao and Sulu from 1916 to 1935, Zamboanga Province from 1935 to 1953, Zamboanga del Sur from 1953 to 1972 and Region IX from 1978 to 1984.

- Population (2010): 391,179

| Period | Representative/Assemblyman | Party-list Representative |
|---|---|---|
| Regular Batasang Pambansa; 1984–1986 | Candu I. Muarip | |
| 8th Congress; 1987–1992 | Alvin G. Dans | |
| 9th Congress; 1992–1995 | Elnorita P. Tugung | |
| 10th Congress; 1995–1998 | Candu I. Muarip | |
| 11th Congress; 1998–2001 | Abdulgani A. Salapuddin (Deputy Speaker of the House of Representatives, 2001–2007) | |
| 12th Congress; 2001–2004 | Abdulgani A. Salapuddin (Deputy Speaker of the House of Representatives, 2001–2007) | |
| 13th Congress; 2004–2007 | Abdulgani A. Salapuddin (Deputy Speaker of the House of Representatives, 2001–2007) | |
| 14th Congress; 2007–2010 | Wahab M. Akbar (deceased, post left unfilled since Nov. 13, 2007) | Mujiv Hataman (Anak Mindanao or AMIN) |
| 15th Congress; 2010–2013 | Hadjiman S. Hataman-Salliman, 2010–2013) | |
| 16th Congress; 2013–2016 | Hadjiman S. Hataman-Salliman, 2010–2013) | Sitti Djalia Hataman (Anak Mindanao or AMIN) |

=== Timeline ===
Pre-Spanish Era Basilan

- 5000 BC - Basilan is first inhabited by Negritos
- 1500–500 BC - Indigenous peoples (Indones, ancestors of Yakans, Sama) arrive in Basilan and displace the Negritos
- 300–200 BC - Bornean "sea peoples" (Malays, ancestors of Tausug, etc.) arrive and displace the Yakans from the west coasts of Basilan
- 1417 - Chinese Imperial Court Mandarin Chan Chien visits the Kingdom of Kumalarang and stayed in Basilan for 2 years
- November 16, 1420 - Ipentun and his retinue, guided by the Court Mandarin Chan Chien, visited the Yongle Emperor of China
- November 3, 1424 - Lapi, successor of Ipentun, sent his ambassador Batikisan, to present a "memorial" to Chinese Emperor Yung Lo

Spanish Conquest & Colonization

- 1521 - Antonio de Pigafetta records that the remaining crew of Magellan's expeditions passed the islands of "Zolo and Taghima"
- 1635 - Sultan Kudarat establishes a Maguindanao base in Lamitan
- 1637 - Gov. Gen. Sebastian Hurtado de Corcuera attack and destroy the Maguindanao base, and Fr. Francisco Lado, S.J. establishes the first Catholic mission in Pasangen (Isabela) on the same year
- 1638 - Datu Ondol, Datu Boto, Datu Kindingan were the first baptized natives of Basilan
- 1654 - Church census showed at least 1,000 Christian families living in Basilan
- 1663 - Spanish garrisons in Zamboanga and Basilan were abandoned to defend Manila from an imminent attack from Chinese pirate Koxinga, and the Jesuits took over administration of the missions as "reducciones", Luis Quindingan (former Datu Kindingan) was made Maestro Campo
- 1718 - Spanish garrisons in Zamboanga and Basilan are re-established
- 1726 - First Treaty between the Spanish and Sulu Sultan Badar ud-din formally ceded Basilan to Spain
- 1744 - Dutch East India Company attacked Jolo and Basilan
- 1746 - Dutch East India Company established a base and trading post which they named Port Holland (Maluso)
- 1747 - Tausug Prince, Datu Bantilan, attacked Port Holland, burned the fort to the ground, and caused to Dutch to flee back to Batavia (Java)
- 1754 - Sultan Muizz ud-Din (former Datu Bantilan), increased his raids and attacks both on Basilan and Zamboanga
- 1798 - British Navy attacked Fort Pilar and Zamboanga
- 1805 - British retreat to Banambangan Island in North Borneo
- 1824 - Spanish Navy sends in the "Marina Sutil" to combat piracy in the Sulu Sea
- 1844–1845 - French Navy blockades Basilan's premier ports
- January 13, 1845 - Basilan's Datus signed a document aboard the French steamer "Archymede" formally signifying their independence from Spain
- February 20, 1845 - Sulu formally cedes Basilan to the French in exchange for 100,000 piastres or 500,000 francs
- August 5, 1845 - French formally surrender all claims over Basilan and turns over its possessions to Spain
- 1845 - Don Ramon Lobo, the Marine Chief of Zamboanga, accompanied Don Cayetano Suarez de Figueroa, District Governor of Zamboanga arrived in Pasangen to build permanent fortifications
- 1848 - Construction of the Fort Isabella Segunda was finished
- 1851 - Second Treaty between Spanish government and Sultan Muhammed Pulalun, again formally ceded Basilan to Spain
- July 30, 1860 - Mindanao was divided into six (6) politico-military districts. Basilan became the capital of the 6th Politico-Military District which includes Sulu and Tawi-Tawi
- 1862 - Jesuits return to Basilan
- 1879 - The Spanish Floating Naval Hospital was constructed on shallows found at the western outlet of the Isabela Channel, this soon became the headquarters of all Spanish Marine and Naval forces in Mindanao
- 1874 - Pedro Cuevas, a Cavite native and convict at the San Ramon penal colony in Zamboanga, escaped and hid in Lamitan
- July 22, 1878 - Treaty of Peace between the Spanish government and the Sulu Sultan again ceded all remaining sovereignty previously enjoyed by the Sultan over the entire Sulu Archipelago to the Spanish crown
- 1880 - Cuevas defeated and killed the Yakan Chieftain of Lamitan, Datu Kalun, married his daughter and used the name 'Datu Kalun' himself
- 1884 - Datu Kalun defeats Ungkaya Pukan and Ungkaya Tindik in battle, the two Ungkayas moving their entire families to the western slopes of Basilan
- 1886 - Lamitan was officially organized and recognized by the Spanish government

American Administration & the Philippine Commonwealth

- December 1899 - Basilan was occupied by American troops after the Treaty of Paris ceded the entire Philippine Archipelago from Spain to the United States
- 1899 - Bates Treaty between Brig. Gen. John C. Bates and Sultan Jamalul Kiram II, again ceded all remaining sovereignty of the Sultan over the entire Sulu Archipelago to the United States government
- 1899–1901 - Capt. Wendell C. Neville was designated Military Governor of Basilan
- July 1, 1901 - Municipality of Zamboanga (Public Act No. 135, which includes all of Basilan) was inaugurated
- September 15, 1911 - City of Zamboanga (Public Act No. 272) was passed
- January 1, 1912 - the City of Zamboanga (which includes Basilan) was inaugurated with American Christopher Bader as the first City Mayor
- 1917 - American Dr. James W. Strong, "the Father of the Philippine Rubber Industry" establishes the first rubber plantation in the Philippines, located in Baluno (Latuan), Basilan
- 1921 - Philippine National Sugar Company, the first 100% Filipino-owned plantation is established in Basilan by Don Juan S. Alano. The company eventually changed its name to Basilan Estates, Inc., the oldest wholly Filipino-owned business firm in Basilan today
- 1927 - Basilan's Menzi Plantation pioneers Palm Oil production in the Philippines
- 1935 - Don Juan S. Alano is elected to the National Assembly of the Philippine Commonwealth, serving uninterrupted until 1942
- February 25, 1936 - Zamboanga becomes a Chartered City
- January 1942 - Japanese troops invade and occupy Basilan, making Fort Isabela Segunda their military barracks and headquarters
- March 1945 - combined American and Philippine Commonwealth troops bomb Fort Isabella Segunda, repulsing the Japanese and re-occupying the island
- 1945 - Filipino soldiers of the 6th, 10th and 102nd Infantry Division of the Philippine Commonwealth Army was landing the beaches and liberated the island and helpful to the local Christian and Muslim guerrilla fighters and American soldiers and defeating Japanese Imperial forces

Philippine Republic

- 1946–1949 - Don Juan S. Alano elected Congressman to the First Congress
- July 1, 1948 - City of Basilan (R. A. 288, authored by Cong. J. S. Alano) is inaugurated, Nicasio S. Valderroza becomes the first City Mayor (appointed by Pres. Elpidio Quirino)
- 1954–1975 - Leroy Brown served as City Mayor (appointed by Pres. Ramon Magsaysay in 1954, and elected for five consecutive terms)
- December 27, 1973 - Pres. Ferdinand Marcos issues Presidential Decree 356 converting the territory of Basilan City to a Province, and reducing the City of Basilan to an area 1 square kilometer in and around Isabela's town center, Col. Tomas nanquil Jr. was designated Military Governor of the Province
- December 2, 1974 - P.D. 593 designated Isabela Municipality as the Provincial Capital, with the Province divided into 10 municipalities, Rear Adm. Romulo M. Espaldon became the second Military Governor of the Province
- December 11, 1975 - P.D. 840 reduced the number of Municipalities to 7, and completely abolished the City of Basilan, dividing it into the barangays of Isabela Proper, Seaside, Timpul, Marketsite, Sta. Cruz and Port Area, Marcos likewise appointed Asan G. Camlian as first civilian Provincial Governor
- December 31, 1975 - the City of Basilan officially expires
- 1984 - Marcos enrolls Basilan into the Lupong Tagapagpaganap ng Pook (LTP) - Western Mindanao
- 1986 - Louis W. Alano becomes OIC Governor of the Province (appointed by Pres. Corazon C. Aquino)
- 1988–2007 - Abdulgani J. Salapuddin is elected Governor of the Province in 1988 and serves uninterrupted until 1998, elected Congressman from 1998 to 2007
- 1989 - Basilan rejects inclusion into the Autonomous Region in Muslim Mindanao (ARMM)
- 1998–2007 - Wahab M. Akbar is elected Governor of the Province in 1998 and serves uninterrupted until 2007, elected Congressman after but served for only 4 months
- April 25, 2001 - Isabela Municipality is converted to a City
- 2001 - Basilan joins the Autonomous Region in Muslim Mindanao (ARMM), except for Isabela City
- 2002 - United States troops pour into Basilan as part of the Balikatan 02-1 Joint US-RP Military Forces Exercise for mutual cooperation and training, and coming in along with them, dozens of Non-Governmental Organizations funded via Overseas Development Assistance (ODA) funds set up shop in Basilan
- 2001–2007 - Rep. Abdulgani Salapuddin is elected Deputy Speaker of the House of Representatives in the 12th and 13th Congresses
- July 1, 2007 - Jum Jainuddin-Akbar becomes the first female Governor of Basilan, while Cherrylyn Santos-Akbar becomes the first female City mayor of Isabela
- November 13, 2007 - Rep. Wahab M. Akbar dies from a bomb-blast at the Philippine Congress (Batasang Pambansa) complex
- December 23, 2011 - Mujiv Hataman, former Anak Mindanao Party-list Representative was appointed Officer-in-Charge of the Autonomous Region in Muslim Mindanao (ARMM) by Philippine President Benigno S. Aquino III, the second Basileño to hold the highest office in an autonomous region
- 2017- Basilan's capital and seat of government was transferred from Isabela to Lamitan. Isabela still remains part of Basilan provincial services but regional services remains in Zamboanga Peninsula instead of ARMM where the province of Basilan belongs.
