= Battle of Bud Dajo =

Battle of Bud Dajo may refer to:

- First Battle of Bud Dajo, 1906
- Second Battle of Bud Dajo, 1911
