= First Battle of Bud Dajo =

1906 massacre of the Moro Rebellion

- Part of the Moro Rebellion
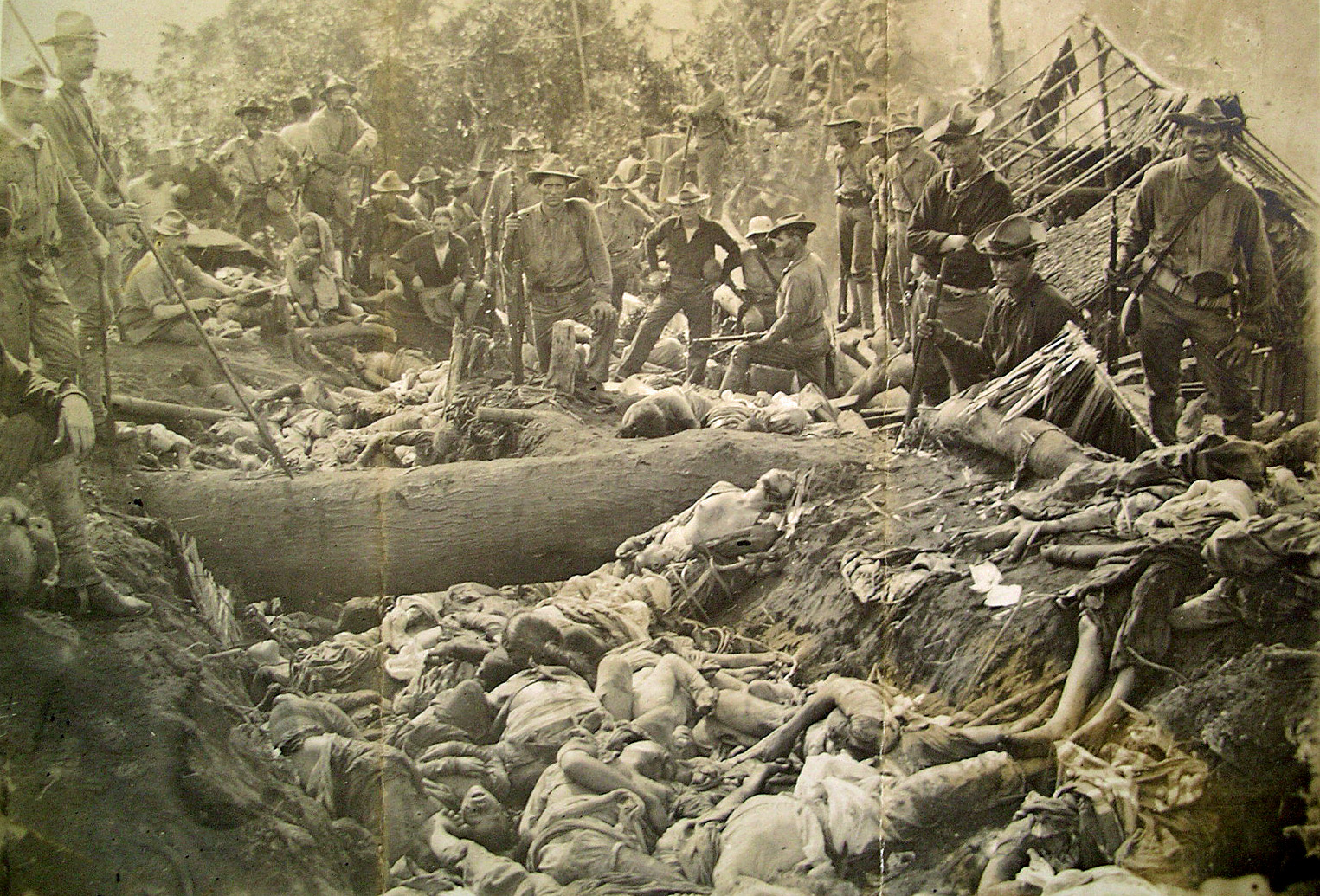
- US soldiers pose with Moro dead after the battle
Date	March 5–8, 1906
Location	Bud Dajo, Jolo Island, Philippines
Result	American victory

Belligerents
United States	Moros

Commanders and leaders
General Leonard Wood; Colonel Joseph W. Duncan	Unknown

Strength
750	1,000+ Moro people

Casualties and losses
15–21 killed, 70 wounded	800-1,000 killed (including women and children)

The First Battle of Bud Dajo, also known as the Moro Crater Massacre, was a counterinsurgency action conducted by the United States Army and Marine Corps against the Moro people in March 1906, during the Moro Rebellion in the southwestern Philippines.

During the engagement, 750 men and officers, under the command of Colonel Joseph Wilson Duncan, assaulted the volcanic crater of Bud Dajo (Tausug: Būd Dahu), which was populated by 800 to 1,000 Tausūg villagers. According to Hermann Hagedorn (who was writing before World War II), the position held by the Moros was "the strongest which hostiles in the Philippines have ever defended against American assault." Although the engagement was a victory for the American forces, it was also an unmitigated public-relations disaster. Whether a battle or massacre, it was certainly the bloodiest of any engagement of the Moro Rebellion, with only six of the hundreds of Moro surviving the bloodshed. Estimates of American casualties range from fifteen to twenty-one killed and seventy wounded.

Whether the occupants of Bud Dajo were hostile to US forces is disputed, as inhabitants of Jolo Island had previously used the crater, which they considered sacred, as a place of refuge during Spanish assaults. Major Hugh Scott, the district governor of Sulu Province, where the incident occurred, recounted that those who fled to the crater "declared they had no intention of fighting, - ran up there only in fright, [and] had some crops planted and desired to cultivate them." The description of the engagement as a "battle" is disputed because of both the overwhelming firepower of the attackers and the lopsided casualties. Author Vic Hurley wrote, "By no stretch of the imagination could Bud Dajo be termed a 'battle'". Mark Twain commented, "In what way was it a battle? It has no resemblance to a battle ... We cleaned up our four days' work and made it complete by butchering these helpless people." A higher percentage of Moros were killed (99 percent) than in other incidents now considered massacres, such as the Wounded Knee Massacre. Some of those killed were women and children. Moro men in the crater who had arms possessed melee weapons. While fighting was limited to ground operations on Jolo, naval gunfire contributed significantly to the overwhelming firepower against the Moros.

== Background ==
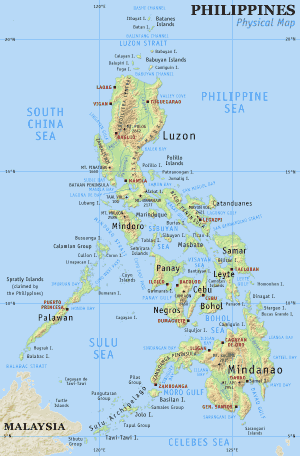
Map of the Philippines

The first battle at Bud Dajo took place during the final days of General Leonard Wood's term as governor of the Moro Province. Wood's term was a time of great reform. Some of these reforms, including the abolition of slavery and the imposition of the cedula, as a registration poll tax, were unpopular with his Moro (Muslim) subjects. The cedula was especially unpopular, since the Moros interpreted it as a form of tribute, and according to Vic Hurley, Moro participation in the cedula was very low, even after 30 years of American occupation. These reforms, coupled with the general resentment of foreign Christian occupiers, created a tense and hostile atmosphere during Wood's tenure, and the heaviest and bloodiest fighting during the American occupation of Mindanao and Sulu Province took place under his watch.

Although Moro hostilities died down during the latter days of Wood's governorship (the tenure of Wood's replacement, General Tasker H. Bliss, was a period of relative peace), it was in this tense atmosphere of Moro resentment that the events leading to the Battle of Bud Dajo played out. According to US President Theodore Roosevelt's friend and biographer Hermann Hagedorn, the Moros living in Bud Dajo were "the rag-tag-and-bobtail remnants of two or three revolts, the black sheep of a dozen folds, rebels against the poll tax, die-hards against the American occupation, outlaws recognizing no datto (ruler) and condemned by the stable elements among the Moros themselves." Vic Hurley, author of Swish of the Kris, adds that "the causes contributing to the battle of Bud Dajo were resentment over the curtailing of slave-trading, cattle-raiding, and women-stealing privileges of the Moros of Sulu." In contrast, Major Hugh Scott describes the occupants of Bud Dajo as harmless villagers seeking refuge from the upheaval on Jolo caused by the actions of American forces.

=== Road to Bud Dajo ===
The chain of events leading to Bud Dajo began when a Moro named Pala ran amok in British-held Borneo. (The Moros differentiate between the religious rite of the juramentado and the strictly secular violence of the amoks; Pala's rampage was of the latter.) Pala then went to ground at his home near the city of Jolo (the seat of the Sultan of Sulu), on the island of Jolo. Colonel Hugh L. Scott, the governor of the District of Sulu, attempted to arrest Pala, but Pala's datu opposed this move. During the resulting fight, Pala escaped. He avoided capture for several months, setting up his own cotta and becoming a datu in his own right. Wood led an expedition against Pala but was ambushed by Moros from the Bud Dajo area with the help of Pala. Wood beat off the ambushers, and many of them found refuge in the volcanic crater of Bud Dajo. Wood determined that the Moros held too strong a position to assault with the forces at hand, and so he withdrew.

Bud Dajo lies six miles (9.7 km) from the city of Jolo and is an extinct volcano, 2,100 feet (640 m) above sea level, steep, conical, and with thickly forested slopes. Only three major paths led up the mountain, and the thick growth kept the Americans from cutting new paths. However, there were many minor paths known only to the Moros that would allow them to resupply even if the main paths were blocked. The crater at the summit is 1,800 yards (1,600 m) in circumference and easily defended. The mountain itself is eleven miles (18 km) in circumference, making a siege difficult.

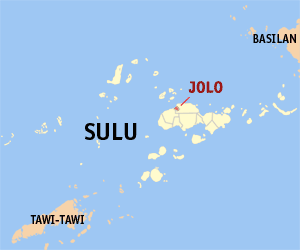
Map of Sulu showing the location of Jolo

Over the months that followed, the occupants of Bud Dajo were joined by more local Moros, bringing the population of the crater up to several hundred. Water was plentiful, and they began farming rice and potatoes. Scott sent the Sultan of Sulu and other high-ranking datus to ask the occupants of Bud Dajo to return to their homes, but they refused. Wood ordered an attack in February 1906, but Scott convinced him to rescind the order, arguing that the opposition of the surrounding datus would keep Bud Dajo isolated. Scott was worried that an attack on Bud Dajo would reveal just how easily defended it was, encouraging repeats of the standoff in the future. Unfortunately, occupants of Bud Dajo began raiding nearby Moro settlements for women and cattle. Although the datu of Jolo continued to condemn the occupants of Bud Dajo, popular support for a general uprising among the Moro commoners of Jolo began to develop.

The crisis at Bud Dajo occurred during a period of leadership transition in Moro Province. On February 1, 1906, Wood was promoted to the position of Commander of the Philippine Division and was relieved as commander of the Department of Mindanao-Jolo by General Tasker H. Bliss. However, Wood retained his position as civil governor of the Moro Province until sometime after the Battle of Bud Dajo. Colonel Scott was absent during part of the crisis, and Captain Reeves, the deputy governor of the Sulu District, served as his substitute.

== Battle ==
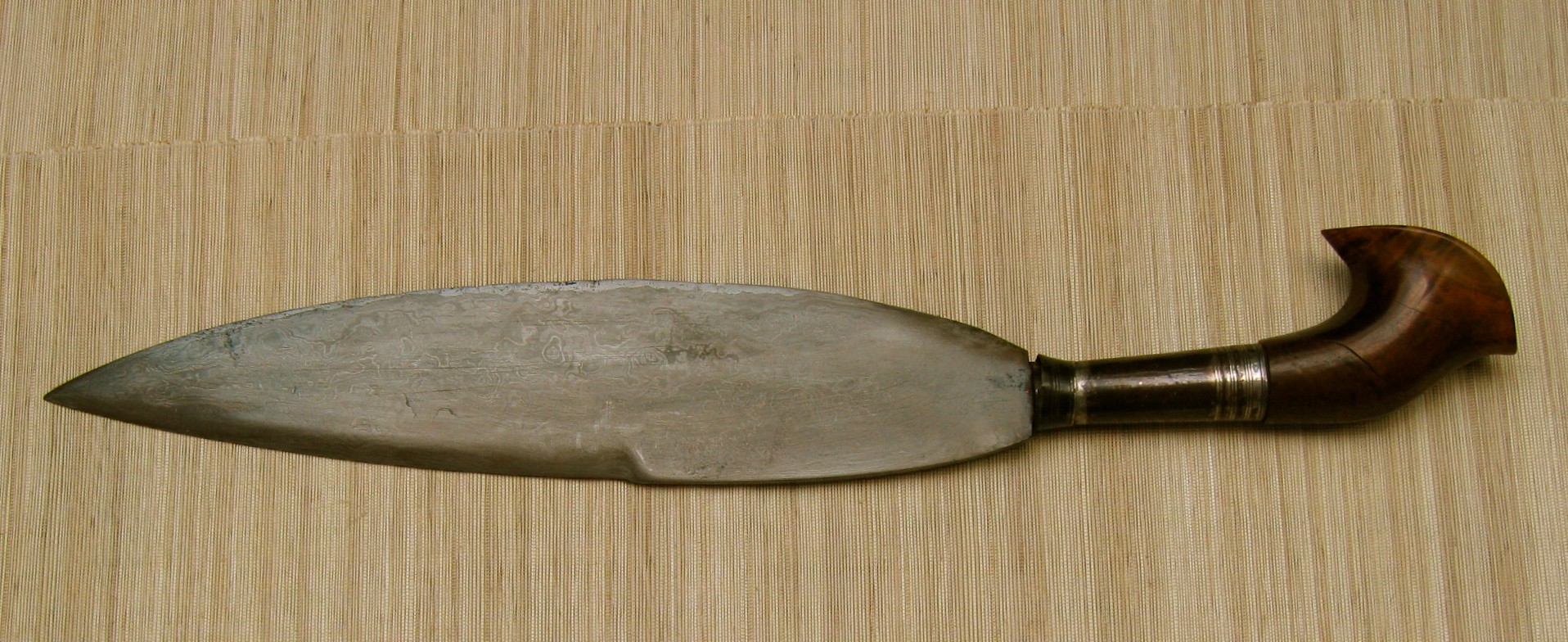
The short sword barung is the Jolo Moros' (i.e., Tausūgs) national weapon

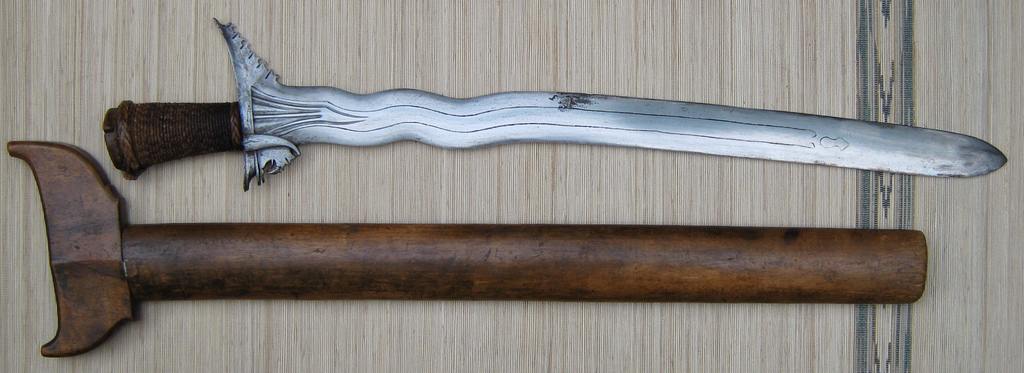
The other preferred blade of the Jolo Moros is the kalis (i.e., kris)

On March 2, 1906, Wood ordered Colonel J. W. Duncan of the 6th Infantry Regiment (stationed at Zamboanga, the provincial capital) to lead an expedition against Bud Dajo. Duncan and Companies K and M took the transport Wright to Jolo. Governor Scott sent three friendly datus up the mountain to ask the Bud Dajo Moros to disarm and disband, or at least send their women and children to the valley. They denied these requests, and Scott ordered Duncan to begin the assault.

The assault force consisted of "272 men of the 6th Infantry, 211 [dismounted] men of the 4th Cavalry, 68 men of the 28th Artillery Battery, 51 Philippine Constabulary under the command of Capt. John R. White, 110 men of the 19th Infantry and 6 sailors from the gunboat Pampanga." The battle began on March 5, as mountain guns fired 40 rounds of shrapnel into the crater. On March 6, Wood and Bliss arrived but left Duncan in direct command. Captain Reeves, the acting governor of the District of Sulu, made one last attempt to negotiate with the occupants of the crater. He failed, and the Americans drew up into three columns and proceeded up the three main mountain paths. The columns were under the command of Major Omar Bundy, Captain Rivers, and Captain Lawton. The going was tough, with the troops ascending a 60% slope, using machetes to clear the path.

At 0700, March 7, Major Bundy's detachment encountered a barricade blocking the path, 500 feet (150 m) below the summit. Snipers picked off Moros, and the barricade was shelled with rifle grenades. The barricade was then assaulted in a bayonet charge. Some of the Moros staged a strong defense, then charged with kalises (the traditional wavy-edged sword of the Moros) and spear. About 200 Moros died in this engagement, and Major Bundy's detachment suffered heavy casualties. Captain Rivers' detachment also encountered a barricade and took it after several hours of fighting, during which a spear severely wounded Rivers himself. Captain Lawton's detachment advanced up a poor path, so steep in places that the Americans proceeded on hands and knees. They were harassed by Moros hurling boulders and occasionally rushing to attack hand-to-hand with krises. Lawton finally took the defensive trenches on the crater rim by storm.

Moro defenders retreated into the crater, and fighting continued until nightfall. During the night, the Americans hauled mountain guns to the crater's edge with block and tackle. At daybreak, the American guns (both the mountain guns and the guns of the Pampanga) opened up on the Moros' fortifications in the crater. American forces then placed a "Machine Gun... in position where it could sweep the crest of the mountain between us and the cotta," killing all Moros in the crater. One account claims that the Moros, armed with kalises and spears, refused to surrender and held their positions. Some of the defenders rushed the Americans and were cut down. The Americans charged the surviving Moros with fixed bayonets; the Moros fought back with their kalis, barung, improvised grenades made with black powder and seashells. Despite the inconsistencies among various accounts of the battle (one in which all occupants of Bud Dajo were gunned down, another in which defenders resisted in fierce hand-to-hand combat), all accounts agree that few, if any, Moros survived.

Out of the estimated 800 to 1,000 Moros at Bud Dajo, only 6 survived. Corpses were piled five feet deep (1.5 meters), and many of the bodies were wounded multiple times. According to Hurley, American casualties were 21 killed and 75 wounded. Lane lists them at 18 killed, 52 wounded. Hagedorn says simply that, "one-fourth of the troops actively engaged have been killed or wounded". By any estimate, Bud Dajo was the bloodiest engagement of the Moro Rebellion.

== Aftermath ==
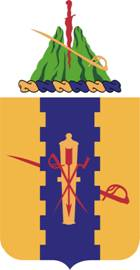
The US 4th Cavalry Regiment's coat-of-arms features a reference to the Bud Dajo campaign: a green volcano is seen at the crest with an inverted kris symbolizing the Moros' defeat. The unit's victory is symbolized by a yellow saber at the charge.

Following the American victory, President Theodore Roosevelt sent Wood a congratulatory cablegram, but reporters stationed at Manila had cabled their own account to the press. The March 11, 1906 New York Times headlines read, "WOMEN AND CHILDREN KILLED IN MORO BATTLE; Mingled with Warriors and Fell in Hail of Shot. FOUR DAYS OF FIGHTING Nine Hundred Persons Killed or Wounded—President Wires Congratulations to the Troops."

The press's account of the "Moro Crater Massacre" fell on receptive ears. There were still deep misgivings among the American public about America's role during the Spanish–American War and the stories of atrocities carried out during the Philippine–American War. The public had also been largely unaware of the continuing violence in the Moro Province, and were shocked to learn that killing continued. Under pressure from Congress, Secretary of War William Howard Taft cabled Wood for an explanation of the "wanton slaughter" of women and children. Despite not being in command of the assault (although he was the senior officer present), Wood accepted full responsibility. By the time the scandal died down, Wood had assumed his post as Commander of the Philippine Division, and General Tasker H. Bliss had replaced him as governor of the Moro Province.

On June 23, 1906, Harper's Weekly published a photograph of Bud Dajo.

Mark Twain condemned the incident strongly in articles. In response to criticism, Wood's explanation of the high number of women and children killed stated that the women of Bud Dajo dressed as men and joined in the combat, and that the men used children as living shields. Hagedorn supports this explanation, by giving an account of Lieutenant Gordon Johnston, who was severely wounded by a woman warrior. A second explanation was given by the Governor-General of the Philippines, Henry Clay Ide, who reported that the women and children were collateral damage, having been killed during the artillery barrages. These conflicting explanations of the high number of women and child casualties brought accusations of a cover-up, adding to the criticism. Furthermore, Wood's and Ide's explanations are at odds with Colonel J. W. Duncan's March 12, 1906, post-action report describing the placement of a machine gun at the edge of the crater to fire upon the occupants. Following Duncan's reports, the high number of non-combatants killed can be explained as the result of indiscriminate machine-gun fire.

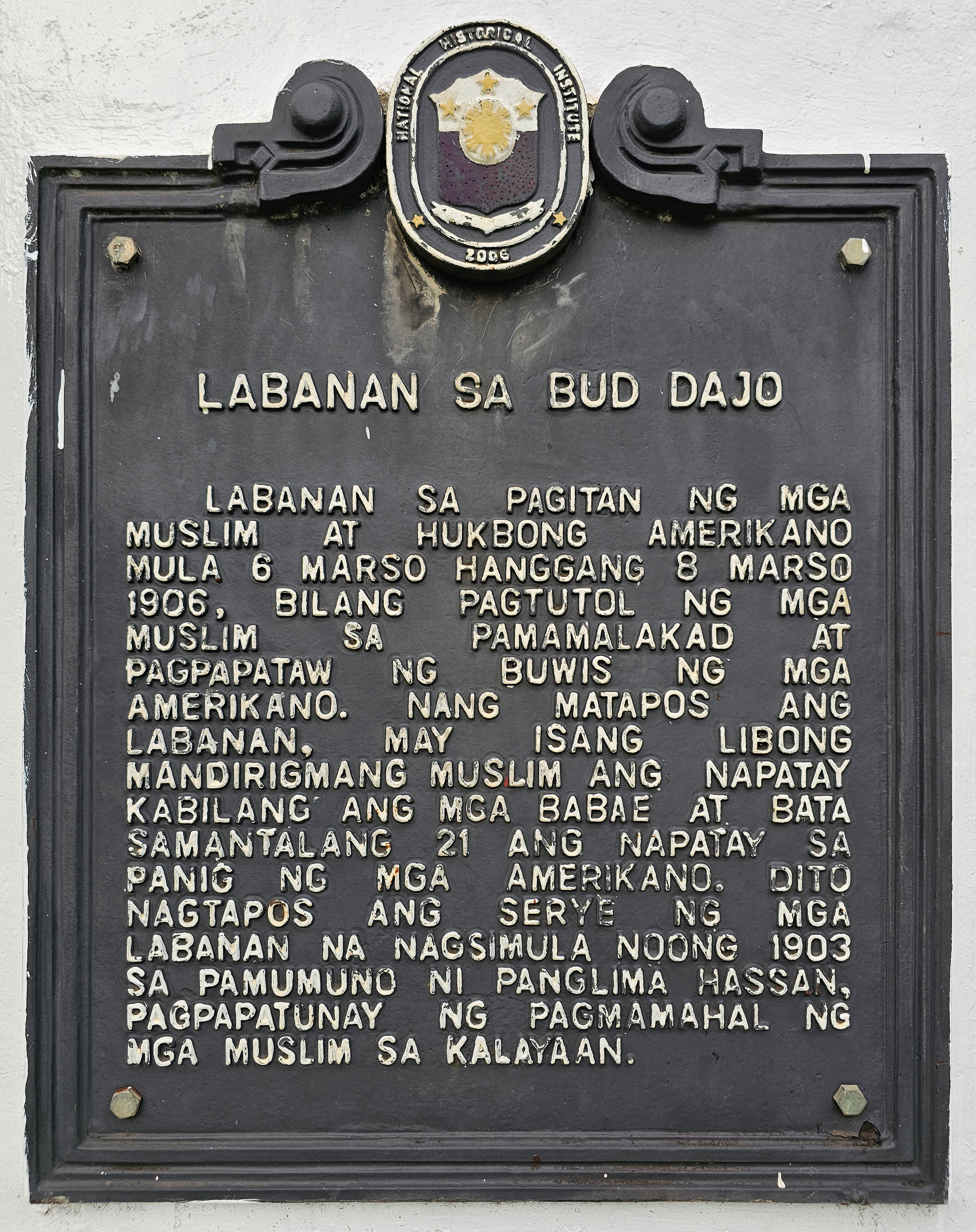
National historical marker installed in 2006 in Jolo to commemorate the battle

Some of Wood's critics accused him of seeking glory by storming the crater rather than besieging the rebels. Wood did show some signs of being a glory hound earlier in his tenure as the governor of the Moro Province, taking the Provincial Army on punitive raids against cottas over minor offenses that would have been better left to the district governors. This heavy-handedness jeopardized relations with friendly datus, who viewed the encroachment of the army as a challenge Wood badly needed military laurels, since he had gone through an uphill battle in the United States Senate over his appointment to the rank of major general, which was finally confirmed in March 1904. Although Wood had served as an administrator in Cuba, he had seen only a hundred days of field service during the Spanish–American War. Wood had been promoted over the heads of many more senior officers, bringing charges of favoritism against President and fellow Rough Rider Teddy Roosevelt. Even though his promotion had been confirmed, Wood's reputation still suffered. Wood's willingness to take responsibility for Bud Dajo did much to improve his reputation within the army.

Wood argued that besieging (surrounding) Bud Dajo would have been impossible, given the ample supplies of the rebels, the 11-mile (18 km) circumference of the mountain, the thickly forested terrain, and the existence of hidden paths up the mountainside. During the Second Battle of Bud Dajo, in December 1911, General "Black Jack" Pershing (the third and final military governor of the Moro Province) did succeed in besieging Bud Dajo, by cutting a lateral trail which encircled the mountain, 300 yd (270 m) downhill from the crater rim. This cut off the Moros in the crater from the hidden mountainside paths. However, the tactical situation facing Pershing in 1911 was far different from that facing Wood in 1906. The incident caused outrage among the native people, as Bud Dajo is considered a sacred site to them. The atrocities would later give rise to anti-American sentiments. Other Moro Rebellions would occur in later decades, which would continue to the 21st century in an independent Philippines.

=== Legacy ===
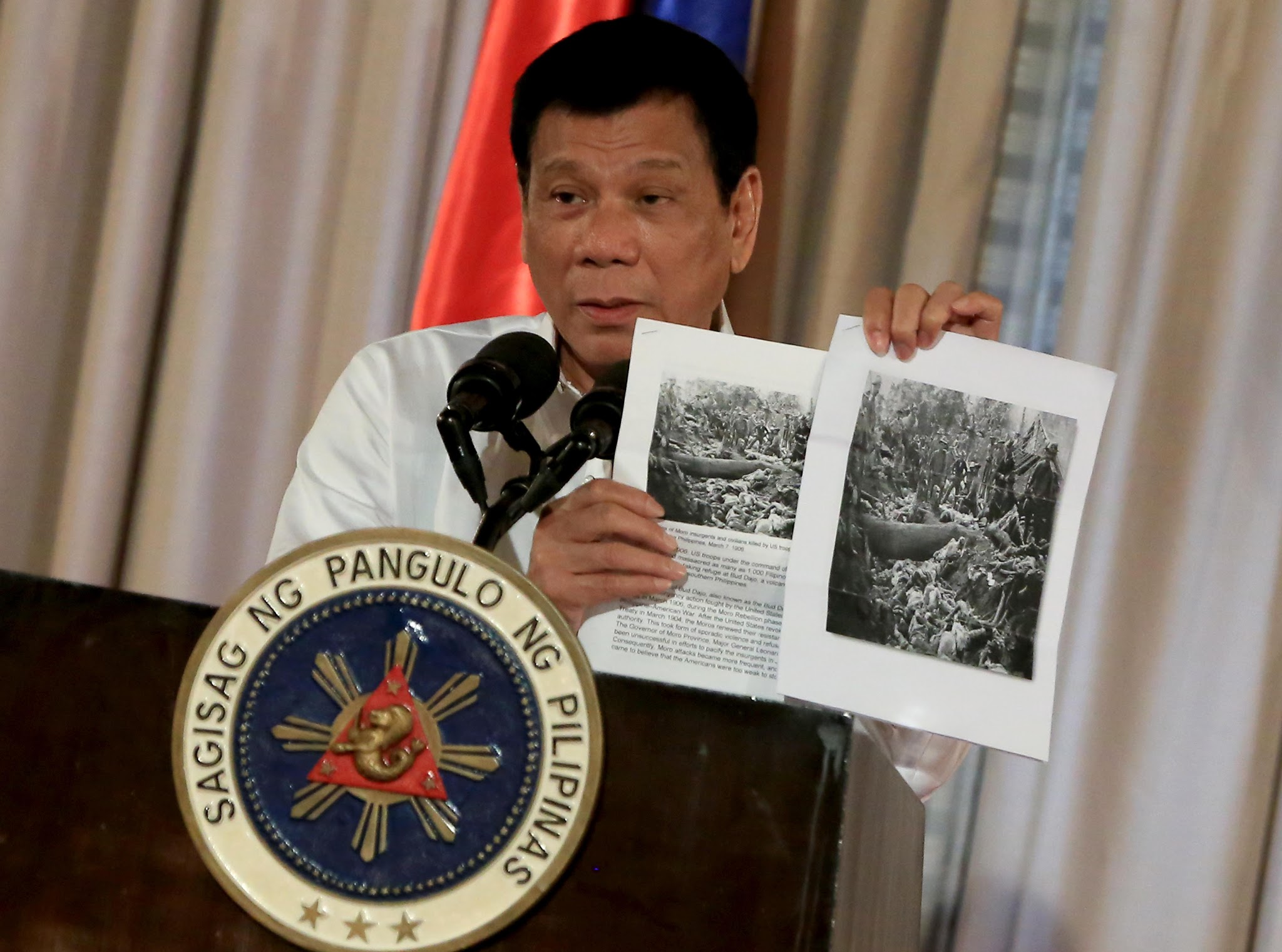
President Rodrigo Duterte shows images of the Bud Dajo massacre during a speech in Malacañan's Rizal Hall on September 12, 2016.

The incident was brought up by President Rodrigo Duterte to criticize America and President Barack Obama in 2016, leading to a cancellation of a planned meeting with Obama; Duterte apologized next day. Duterte cited the incident a second time in criticizing America while calling for the exit of American troops.

In 2015, the Moro National Liberation Front published an open letter to President Obama demanding to know why America was supporting Filipino colonialism against the Moro Muslim people, the Filipino "war of genocide", and atrocities against Moros. The letter stated that the Moro people have resisted and fought against the atrocities of Filipino, Japanese, American, and Spanish invaders including the Moro Crater massacre at Bud Dajo, committed by Americans.

== See also ==
- Second Battle of Bud Dajo
- Kiram-Bates Treaty
