= Jolo Group of Volcanoes =

Active volcano group in Jolo, Philippines

Coordinates: 6.013°N 121.057°E

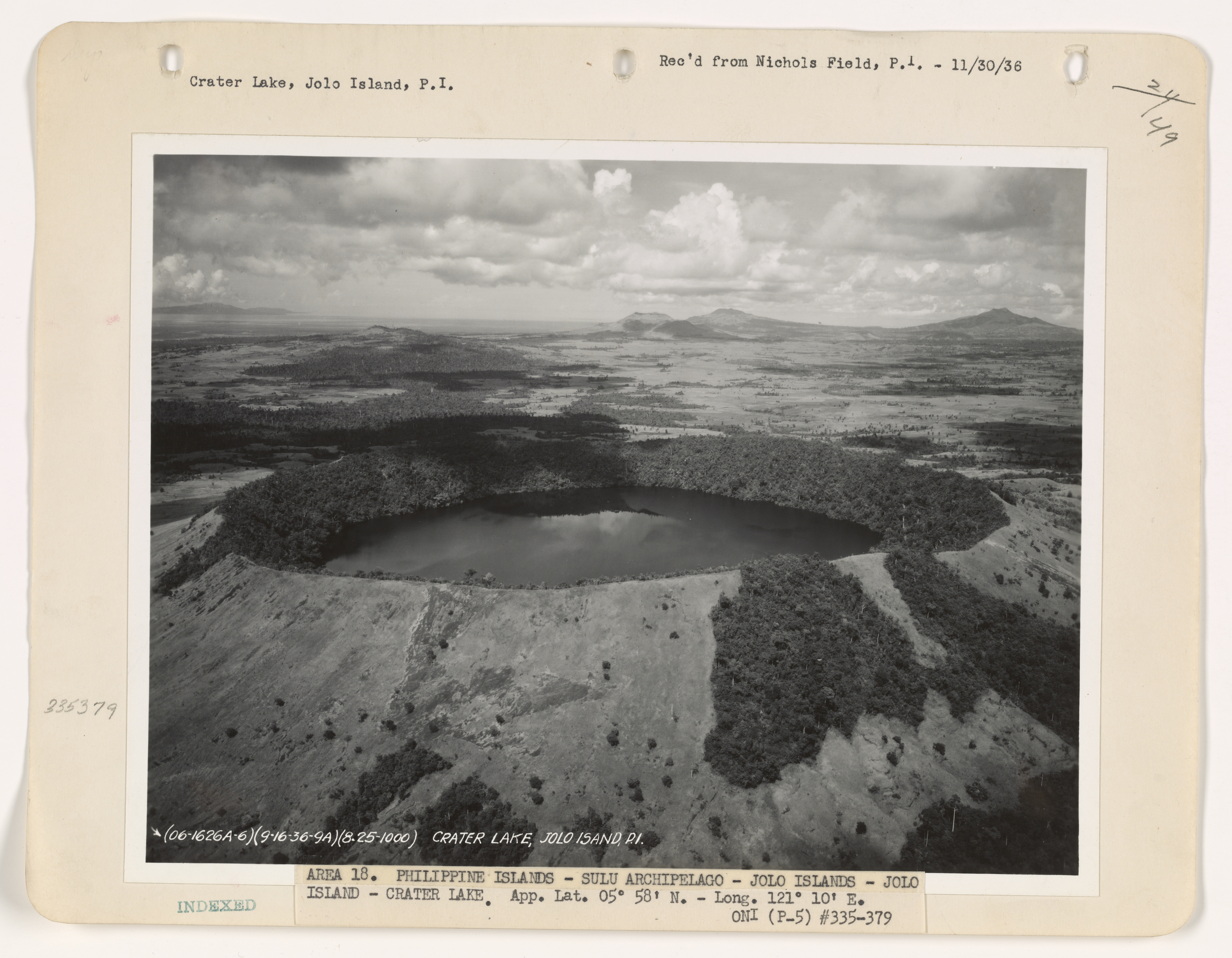
Crater lake in Jolo Island, 1936

The Jolo Group of Volcanoes, more commonly referred to as the Jolo Group, are an active group of volcanoes on the island of Jolo in Southern Philippines. The Global Volcanism Program lists Jolo as one of the active volcanoes in the Philippines. The Philippine Institute of Volcanology and Seismology (PHIVOLCS) collectively lists the group under Bud Dajo, one of the cinder cones on the island.

== Location ==
Jolo is a volcanic island located 150 kilometres (93 mi) southwest of the southern tip of the Zamboanga Peninsula of Mindanao Island. The island is part of the Sulu Archipelago, in the province of Sulu, located within the Zamboanga Peninsula, one of the Regions of the Philippines.

== Physical features ==
The figure-eight shaped island is about 60 kilometres (37 mi) at its longest, about 15 kilometres (9.3 mi) at its widest and about 5 kilometres (3.1 mi) at the narrowest section. The volcanic island is dotted with cinder cones, tuff cones, pyroclastic cones, maars and crater lakes.

The highest point in the island is Mount Tumatangas with an elevation of 811 metres (2,661 ft) asl. Bud Dajo has an elevation of 620 metres (2,030 ft) asl.

Guimba, Matanding, and Sungal are some other volcanic cones near Bud Dajo. Four crater lakes are located on the island: Lake Seit, Lake Panamao, Lake Timpuak and Sani Crater Lake. Solfataric activity is found at Seit Lake.

== Volcanic activity ==
On January 4, 1641, a volcanic eruption covered much of Mindanao in darkness and sent showers of ash as far as Cebu and Panay. It was reported at the time as being from a small island "opposite the main river of Jolo"; the only possible source of eruption in Jolo is Mount Dakula, near Lake Panamao. From recent studies, the eruption was finally attributed to Mount Parker, in South Cotabato.

A tsunami occurred in 1897, believed to have been caused by a local submarine eruption on September 21, 1897. It is possible that this eruption was centered at Lake Seit, a volcanic maar with still active solfatara.

Volcanoes in the Jolo Group are young, and considered active on the basis of the probable eruptions detailed above.

== Geology ==
Local rock types are predominantly basalt and andesite.

All volcanos in the Philippines are part of the Pacific ring of fire. The Jolo Group is part of the Sulu Volcanic Arc, one of the two northeastern arms of the Sunda Plate, which is in collision with the Philippine Mobile Belt. It is an area of frequent earthquakes and volcanic activity.

Like most volcanos in the former Sultanate of Sulu, the group is little studied scientifically.

== See also ==
- List of volcanoes in the Philippines
  - List of active volcanoes in the Philippines
  - List of potentially active volcanoes in the Philippines
  - List of inactive volcanoes in the Philippines
- Philippine Institute of Volcanology and Seismology
