= Bud Dajo =

Mountain in Sulu, Philippines

- Būd Dahu; Bundok Dajo; Mount Dajo
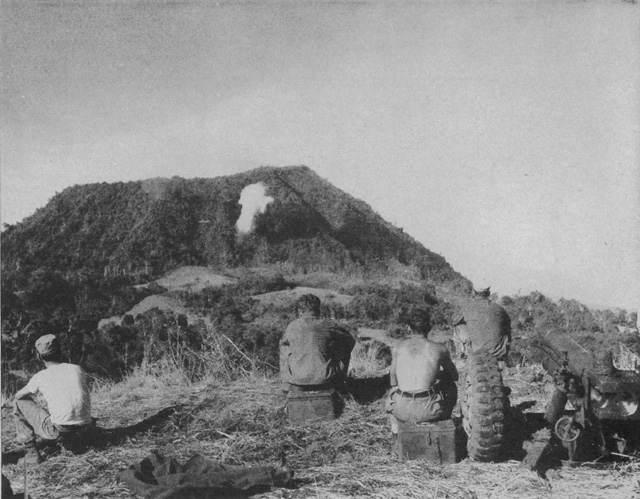
- Bud Dajo photographed in 1945

Highest point
- Elevation: 620 m (2,030 ft)
- Prominence: 620 m (2,030 ft)
- Listing: Mountains of the Philippines
- Coordinates: 6°0′48″N 121°03′24″E

Naming
- Language of name: tsg

Geography
- Location within Mindanao Location within Philippines
- Location: Sulu, Philippines

Geology
- Mountain type: Cinder cone
- Volcanic arc: Zamboanga-Sulu Arc
- Last eruption: Unknown

Bud Dajo (Tausug: Būd Dahu; Spanish: Monte Dajó), is a cinder cone and the second highest point (+600m) in Sulu, a province of the Philippines in the Sulu Archipelago. It is one of the cinder cones that make up the island of Jolo and part of the Jolo Volcanic Group. The extinct volcano is located 8 kilometres (5.0 mi) southeast from the town of Jolo in Sulu. The mountain and adjacent lands were declared as Mount Dajo National Park in 1938. It is a sacred mountain for the locals, and the Tausug people at-large, as well as nearby ethnic groups.

== Physical features ==
The cinder cone has an elevation of 620 metres (2,030 ft) with a base diameter of 9.5 kilometres (5.9 mi). On the summit of the mountain is 0.5 kilometres (0.31 mi) crater that is breached to the southwest. The other volcanic edifices adjacent to Bud Dajo are: Matanding, located northeast of the Bud Dajo with an elevation of 400 metres (1,300 ft) asl; Guimba, east and elevation of 482 metres (1,581 ft) asl; and Sungal, southeast which is 518 metres (1,699 ft) asl., dangerous volcano.

== Geology ==
The basaltic volcanic cone is part of Zamboanga-Sulu volcanic arc.

== Eruptions falsely attributed to the mountain ==
=== 1641 ===
Two volcanoes falsely attributed to the eruption on January 4, 1641, which engulfed southern Philippines in darkness. Further studies later found the eruption to have come from Mount Melibengoy in Cotabato.

=== 1897 ===
The earthquake and subsequent tsunami on September 21, 1897, that devastated the Southern Philippines was believed to be from a submarine eruption therefore excludes Bud Dajo.

== PHIVOLCS monitoring activity ==
A short-term monitoring (seismic and visuals) surveys were conducted by the Philippine Institute of Volcanology and Seismology in 1993 and in 1997 on the mountain. No unusual activities were observed within the vicinity of the volcano.

== Mount Dajo National Park ==
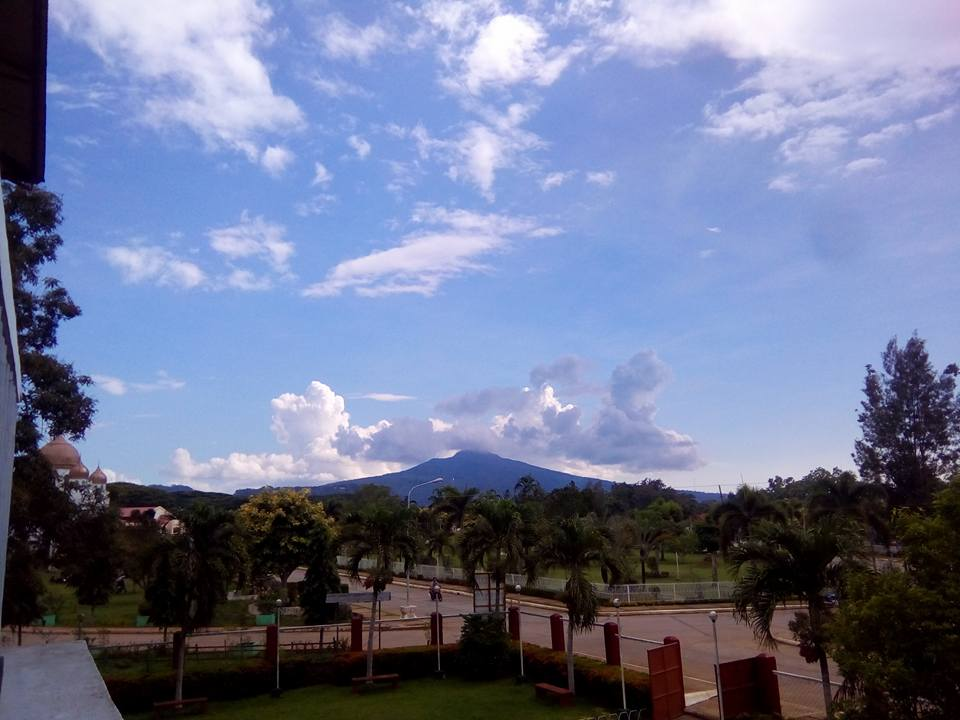
Bud Dajo as seen from Jolo National Museum

The mountain and surrounding areas were declared as a national park by Proclamation No. 261 on February 28, 1938, encompassing 213 hectares (530 acres) of land. Recent reports have shown that the mountain is very deforested with few remaining forest cover usually on the steep ridges. The game refuge is not currently listed as a protected area under the National Integrated Protected Areas System (NIPAS) of the Department of Environment and Natural Resources.

=== Fauna ===
Some vulnerable and endangered species, not necessarily endemic to the area, but which can be found within the Mount Dajo National Park are (from BirdLife International):

1. Grey imperial pigeon (Ducula pickeringii), Vulnerable
2. Philippine cockatoo or the red-vented cockatoo (Cacatua haematuropygia), Critically endangered
3. Sulu hornbill (Anthracoceros montani), Critically endangered
4. Sulu pygmy woodpecker Dendrocopos ramsayi, Vulnerable
5. Winchell's kingfisher or rufous-lored kingfisher (Todiramphus winchelli), Vulnerable

== Historical relevance ==
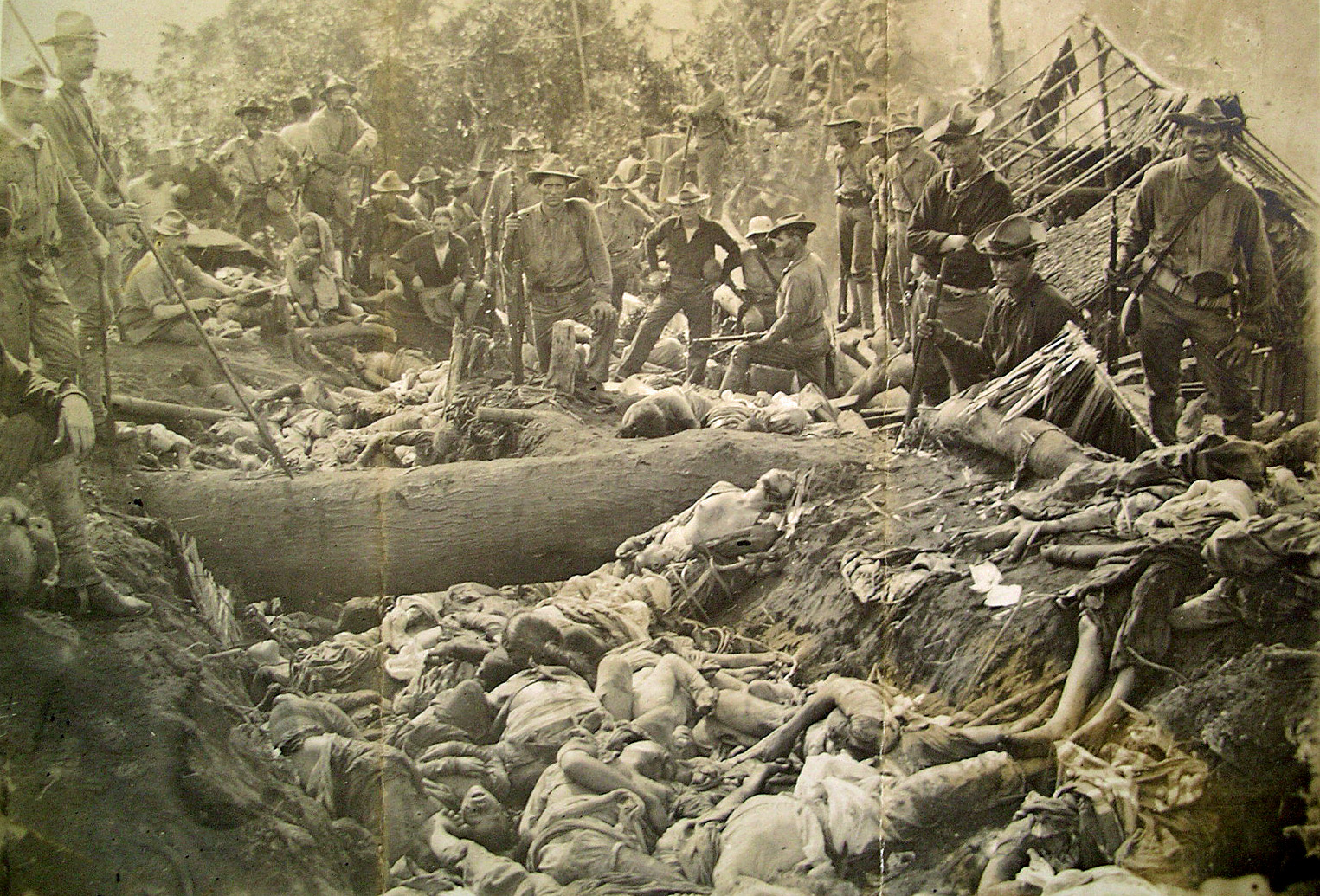
American soldiers pose for a trophy photo with hundreds of rotting Moro bodies, and severed heads and limbs and dismembered torsos surround them at Bud Dajo. Various photographs of the aftermath are preserved at the Library of Congress.

Bud Dajo is a sacred mountain for the indigenous peoples of the Sulu archipelago. The mountain was the site of the First Battle of Bud Dajo during the Moro Rebellion of the Philippine–American War in 1906, which culminated in the killing by U.S. forces of over 800-900 villagers, mostly civilians, hiding on the crater of Bud Dajo. The event is known as the Moro Crater Massacre. The killings committed by the American government, under governor-general Leonard Wood and American president and Republican Theodore Roosevelt, included the murder of hundreds of women and children, whose bodies were photographed by the American soldiers as war trophies. In many of the photographs, the American soldiers smiled as skulls, rotting severed limbs and dismembered torsos, and blown-out heads with punctured cheeks were piled up around them.

When the photographs and numbers of killings were known to the American public, the government at the time received some backlash. In an attempt to cover-up the massacre, the American government branded the historical event as fake news, and when branding didn't work, they changed the narrative and explained that the Moros of Bud Dajo were uncivilized, falsely depicting them as war-thirsty beings. In truth, the Moros were just defending their land from colonizers that sought to erase their cultural identities. The American government also justified the killing of women by stating that their soldiers killed them because they wore traditional pants, which made them look like men in the eyes of the soldiers. Although the massacre received backlash from certain parts of the American public, the issue later faded from the American public knowledge and discussion as other issues occurred in their daily lives.

The horrific atrocities committed by the Americans during the massacre continue to influence the peoples of the Sulu archipelago today, whose people were obliterated in the name of colonialism and white supremacy, and whose sacred mountain and its spirits were disrespected. In 1911, another similar massacre now called the Second Battle of Bud Dajo was committed by the American government under governor-general Wood and the new American president, another Republican, William Howard Taft, with fewer casualties due to negotiations, where the Moros were forced to leave the sacred ground under American colonial rule. In 1913, the American government under both Wood and Taft launched another similar massacre at Bud Bagsak, another sacred mountain near Bud Dajo.

== See also ==
- List of active volcanoes in the Philippines
- List of potentially active volcanoes in the Philippines
- List of inactive volcanoes in the Philippines
- List of national parks of the Philippines
