= Hassan uprising =

1903-1904 Moro Rebellion uprising

- Part of Moro Rebellion
Date	October 1903 – March 1904
Location	Sulu Sultanate
Result	American victory

Belligerents
United States	Moro people Sultanate of Sulu

Commanders and leaders
Leonard Wood; Hugh L. Scott; Robert L. Bullard	Datu Panglima Hassan; Usap; Laksamana

Strength
Approx. 400–500	Unknown

The Hassan uprising was a rebellion among the Moro people of Jolo during the Moro Rebellion. It was led by a Muslim datu named Datu Hassan, the youngest son of the Great Raja Muda Ammang. Panglima Hassan had assembled followers in Jolo's Crater Lake region, preparing to attack Jolo. Leonard Wood led a force of 1,250 soldiers, including Robert L. Bullard's 28th Infantry, in an attack on "Hassan's Palace", the "strongest cotta in the Sulu Archipelago". The Moro's fled and the Americans burned the fort. Hassan surrendered but then escaped, which led Wood to destroy every hostile cotta he encountered, resulting in the death of Datu Andung on Mount Suliman. Although never capturing Hassan, Wood did end up killing 1,500 Moros, which included women and children.

The uprising ended in March 1904, when Hassan and two others were cornered by 400 men under Scott's command at Bud Bagsak. It took 34 gunshots to finally kill Hassan. The Moros only had a few rifles and kris blades. The injured Hassan holding a kris in his mouth almost reached an American who was injured. However, other accounts suggest that he survived and was cared for by his relative, Panglima Bandahala ibn Sattiya Munoh, a trusted adviser and close family member of the Sultan. It was only a head shot with a .45 caliber which killed Hassan since an American was about get hacked with a barong wielded by Hassan despite being shot 32 times already by Krag rifle bullets.
