= Moro Rebellion =

1902–1913 uprising during the Philippine-American War

- Part of the post-war insurgency phase of the Philippine–American War
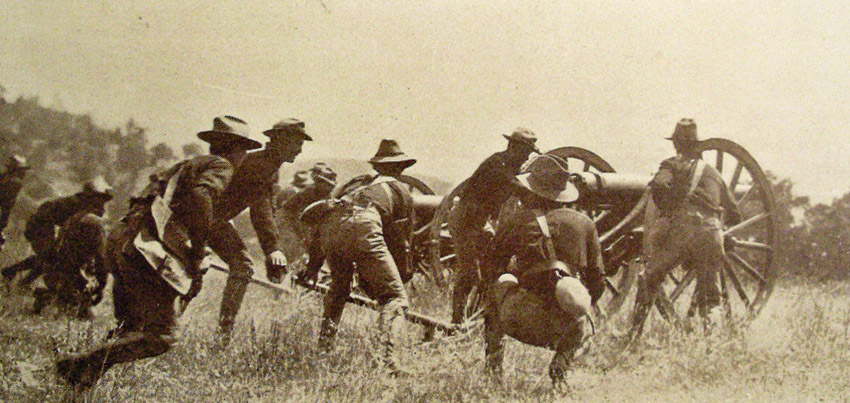
- American soldiers battling against Moro fighters
Date	May 3, 1902 – June 15, 1913
Location	Mindanao and Sulu Archipelago (today part of southern Philippines)
Result	American victory
Territorial changes	Total annexation of the Philippine Islands; Formation of the Department of Mindanao and Sulu

Belligerents
United States: Insular Government	Sultanate of Sulu; Maguindanao Sultanate; Lanao Confederacy; First Philippine Republic (until 1901)

Commanders and leaders
George W. Davis; Leonard Wood; Tasker H. Bliss; John J. Pershing	Jamalul Kiram II; Panglima Hassan; Datu Ali; Nicolas Capistrano

Strength
25,000	Unknown

Casualties and losses
United States: 130 killed 270-323 wounded ~500 dead from disease Philippine Scouts: 111-116 killed 109-189 wounded Philippine Constabulary: 1,706 casualties	Official casualties are unknown

The Moro Rebellion (1902–1913) was an armed conflict between the Moro people and the United States military during the Philippine–American War. The rebellion occurred after the conclusion of the conflict between the United States and the First Philippine Republic, and saw the US move to impose its authority over the Muslim states in Mindanao, Jolo, and the neighboring Sulu Archipelago.

== Background ==
The Moros have a 400-year history of resisting foreign rule. The violent armed struggle against the Spaniards, against the Americans, against the Japanese, and against the Filipinos, is considered by current Moro leaders as part of the four centuries-long "national liberation movement" of the Bangsamoro (Moro Nation). This conflict persisted and developed into their current war for independence against the Philippine state. A "culture of jihad" emerged among the Moros due to the centuries-long war against the Spanish invaders.

The ethnic Moro population of the southern Philippines resisted both Spanish and American colonization. The Moro areas of western Mindanao have been the most rebellious areas in the Philippines, along with Samar and Bicol. The Spaniards were restricted to a handful of coastal garrisons or forts, and they made occasional punitive expeditions into the vast interior regions. After a series of unsuccessful attempts during the centuries of Spanish rule in the Philippines, Spanish forces occupied the abandoned city of Jolo, Sulu, the seat of the Sultan of Sulu, in 1876. The Spaniards and the Sultan of Sulu signed the Spanish Treaty of Peace on July 22, 1878. Control of the Sulu archipelago outside of the Spanish garrisons was handed to the Sultan. The treaty had translation errors: According to the Spanish-language version, Spain had complete sovereignty over the Sulu archipelago, while the Tausug version described a protectorate instead of an outright dependency. Despite the very nominal claim to the Moro territories, Spain ceded them to the United States in the Treaty of Paris which signaled the end of the Spanish–American War.

Following the American occupation of the Northern Philippines in 1899, Spanish forces in the Southern Philippines were disbanded and retreated to the garrisons at Zamboanga and Jolo. American forces took control of the Spanish government in Jolo on May 18, 1899, and at Zamboanga in December 1899.

=== Kiram–Bates Treaty ===
After the American government informed the Moros that it would continue the old colonial protectorate relationship with Spain, the Moro Sulu Sultan rejected this and demanded that a new treaty be negotiated. The United States signed the Kiram–Bates Treaty with the Moro Sulu Sultanate which guaranteed the Sultanate's autonomy in its internal affairs and governance if they stayed out of the Philippine–American War. This allowed Brigadier General John C. Bates to concentrate his forces on repressing the Filipino resistance in Luzon. Once the Americans defeated the northern Filipinos, the treaty with the Moros was canceled by Bates, the sultan was betrayed, and the Americans invaded Moroland.

=== Philippine Republic conflicts (1899–1901) ===
The Philippine Army in the southern Philippines was commanded by General Nicolas Capistrano, and American forces conducted an expedition against him in the winter of 1900–1901. On March 27, 1901, Capistrano surrendered. President Emilio Aguinaldo had been captured a few days earlier in Luzon. This major victory in the war in the north allowed the Americans to devote more resources to the south, and they began to push into Moroland.

On August 31, 1901, Brigadier General George Whitefield Davis was appointed commander of the Department of Mindanao-Jolo, relieving William August Kobbé. Davis adopted a conciliatory policy towards the Moros. American forces under his command had standing orders to buy Moro produce when possible and to have "heralds of amity" precede all scouting expeditions. Peaceful Moros would not be disarmed. Polite reminders of America's anti-slavery policy were allowed.

One of Davis' subordinates, Captain John J. Pershing, assigned to the American garrison at Iligan, set out to improve relations with the Moros of the Maranao tribes on the northern shore of Lake Lanao. He established friendly relations with Amai-Manabilang, the retired Sultan of Madaya. Although retired, Manabilang was the single most influential person among the inhabitants of the lake's northern shore. His alliance did much to secure American standing in the area.

Not all of Davis' subordinates were as diplomatic as Pershing. Many veterans of the American Indian Wars took the "only good Indian is a dead Indian" mentality with them to the Philippines, and "civilize 'em with a Krag" became a similar catchphrase.

== Conflict ==
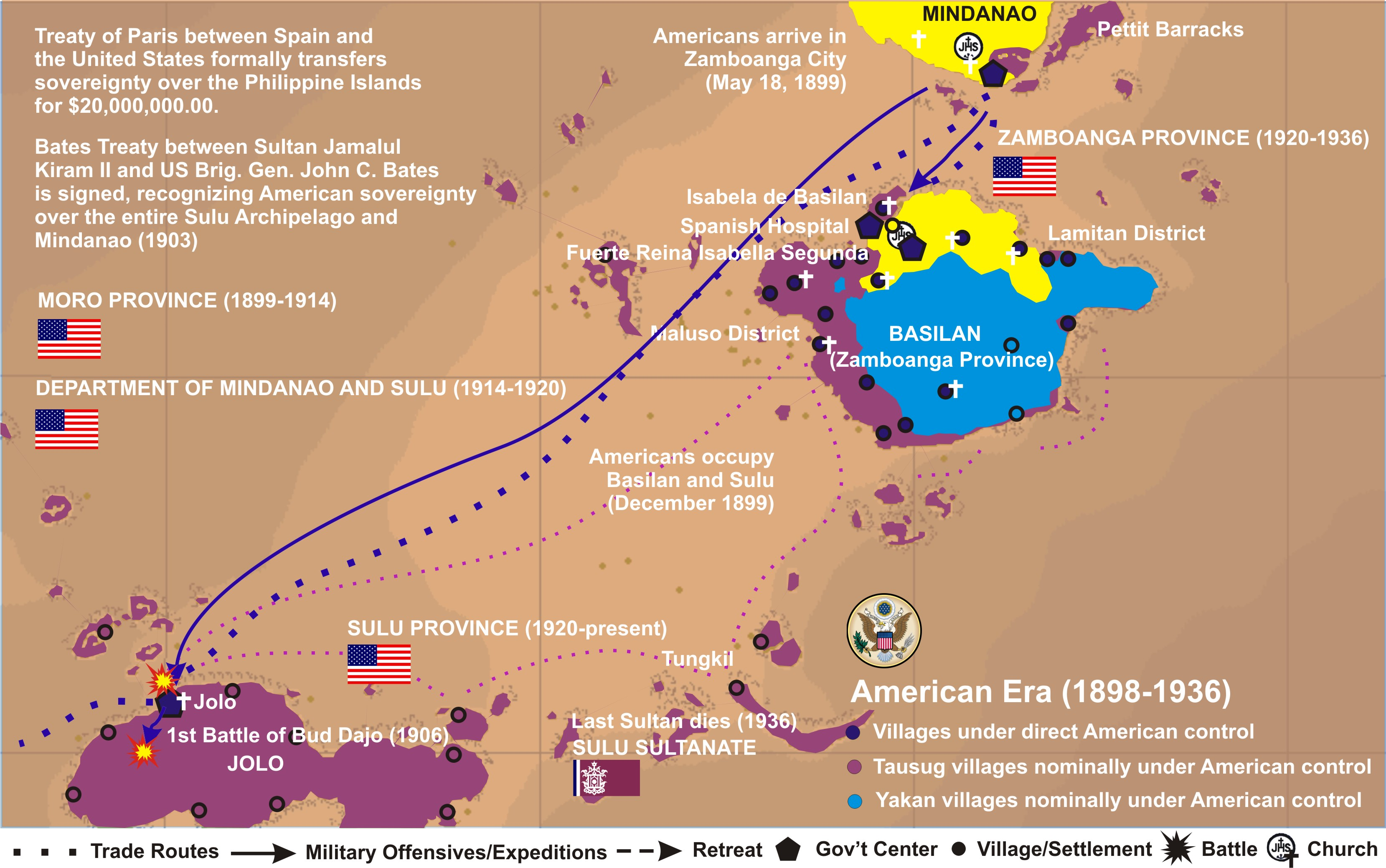
Map of Basilan during the American colonial era

Relations between American troops and the Moros abruptly deteriorated in March 1902. On March 9, an American soldier was killed by unidentified assailants outside the port of Parang. Three days later, an 18-man cavalry detachment in the same area was ambushed by Moros, and one soldier was killed. On March 30, another American was hacked to death by Moros outside the nearby port of Malabang.

These ambushes of American troops by Moros, one of which involved juramentados, occurred to the south of Lake Lanao, outside of Manabilang's sphere of influence. These events prompted Major General Adna Chaffee, then the military governor of the Philippines, to issue a declaration on April 13, 1902. The declaration began, "Under the Treaty of Paris between Spain and the United States, ... the Philippine Islands, including the island of Mindanao, were ceded by Spain to the United States.", and demanded that the killers of American troops and stolen government property be handed over to the United States. Chafee's declaration was an attempt at a peaceful resolution. However, the Moros had never heard of the Treaty of Paris and considered that Spain, which had never successfully conquered Mindanao, could not cede their land to anyone. They considered Chaffee's declaration arrogant and rejected his demands.

The Americans, unaware of the long history of internecine Moro feuding, which could have led one Moro group to attack American troops friendly with another, sent an intermediary to open talks with a local group. Also unknown to the Americans, the leader of that group had a personal dislike of the intermediary. The intermediary was told that Americans were intent on proselytizing the Moros away from Islam and taking their lands. The Americans viewed this as defiance.

The Moros being non-compliant, a punitive expedition under Colonel Frank Baldwin set out to settle matters with the south-shore Moros. Although an excellent officer, Baldwin was "eager", and a worried Davis joined the expedition as an observer. On May 2, 1902, Baldwin's expedition attacked a Moro cotta (fortress) at the Battle of Pandapatan, also known as the Battle of Bayang. Pandapatan's defenses were unexpectedly strong, leading to 18 American casualties during the fighting. On the second day, the Americans used ladders and moat-bridging tools to break through the Moro fortifications, and a general slaughter of the Moro defenders followed.

The expeditionary force was built in Camp Vickers, one mile south of Pandapatan, and Davis assigned Pershing to Baldwin's command as an intelligence officer and as director of Moro affairs. As director, 'Black Jack' Pershing had a veto over Baldwin's movements, which was an unstable arrangement. This arrangement was tested when survivors of Pandapatan began building a cotta at Bacolod. Baldwin wanted to move against the hostile Moros immediately, but Pershing warned that doing so could create an anti-American coalition among the surrounding Datus, while patient diplomacy could establish friendly relations with most of the Moros, isolating the hostile minority. Baldwin grudgingly agreed. On June 30, Pershing assumed command of Camp Vickers, and Baldwin returned to Malabang. A command the size of Camp Vickers would normally have gone to an officer with the rank of major, and a careful shuffling of personnel would be required to ensure that reinforcements to the Camp did not include officers who were senior to Pershing.

On July 4, 1902, President Theodore Roosevelt issued a proclamation declaring an end to the Philippine Insurrection and a cessation of hostilities in the Philippines "except in the country inhabited by the Moro tribes, to which this proclamation does not apply." Later that month, Davis was promoted and replaced Chaffee as the supreme commander of American forces in the Philippines. Command of the Mindanao-Jolo Department went to Brigadier General Samuel S. Sumner. Meanwhile, Pershing settled down to conduct diplomacy with the surrounding Moros, and a July 4 celebration had 700 guests from neighboring rancherias. In September 1902, he led the Masiu Expedition, which resulted in a victory that helped establish American dominance in the area. On February 10, 1903, Pershing was declared a Datu by the formerly hostile Pandita Sajiduciaman of the Bayan Moros (who had been defeated at the Battle of Pandapatan) – the only American to be so honored. Pershing's career at Camp Vickers culminated in the march around Lake Lanao during April and May 1903. The Dansalan, also known as the Marawi Expedition, included the Battle of Bacolod and the First Battle of Taraka, but was otherwise peaceful. This expedition quickly became a symbol of American control over the Lake Lanao region and was met with dismay by the Moro Maranao inhabitants of the region.

While Pershing was working to the south of Lake Lanao, Major Robert Lee Bullard was working to the north, building a road from Iligan to Marawi. Although never officially declared one, like Pershing, he was regarded by the Moros as a Datu. Because of the Lake Lanao Moros' very personalistic style of leadership, they had trouble seeing them as two officers in the same army. Instead, they saw them as two powerful chieftains who might become rivals. During Pershing's March Around Lake Lanao, one Moro ran to Bullard, exclaiming that Pershing had gone Juramentado, meaning berserk, and that Bullard had better run up the white flag (signaling that they had no quarrel with Pershing's troops). Bullard was unable to explain to the Moro why he was not worried about Pershing's approach. On another occasion, a powerful datu proposed an alliance with Bullard to defeat Pershing and establish overlordship over the entire Lake Lanao region. On June 1, 1903, the Moro Province was created, which included "all of the territory of the Philippines lying south of the eight parallel of latitude, excepting the island of Palawan and the eastern portion of the northwest peninsula of Mindanao." The province had a civil government, but many civil service positions, including the district governors and their deputies, were held by members of the American military. The governor of the province served as the commander of the Department of Mindanao-Jolo. This system of combined civil and military administration had several motivations. One was the continued Moro hostilities. Another was the Army's experience during the Indian Wars when it came into conflict with the civilian Bureau of Indian Affairs. A third was that the Moros, with their feudal, personalistic style of government, would have no respect for a military leader who submitted to the authority of a non-combatant.

In addition to the executive branch, under the governor, the province also had a legislative branch: the Moro Council. This Council "consisted of the governor, a state attorney, a secretary, a treasurer, a superintendent of schools, and an engineer." Although the governor appointed all of the other members of the council, this body was permanent and provided a more solid foundation for laws than the fiats of the governor, which might be overturned by his successor.

The province was divided into five districts, with American officers serving as district governors and deputy governors. These districts included: Cotabato, Davao, Lanao, Sulu, and Zamboanga. The districts were subdivided into tribal wards, with major datus serving as ward chiefs and minor datus serving as deputies, judges, and sheriffs. This system took advantage of the existing structure of the Moro political society, which was based on personal ties, while paving the way for a more individualistic society in which the office, rather than the person holding it, would be respected.

On August 6, 1903, Major General Leonard Wood assumed his position as the governor of Moro Province and commander of the Department of Mindanao-Jolo. Wood was somewhat heavy-handed in his dealing with the Moros, being "personally offended by the Moro propensity for blood feuds, polygamy, and human trafficking" and with his "ethnocentrism sometimes [leading] him to impose American concepts too quickly in Moroland." In addition to his views of the Moros, Wood also faced an uphill Senate battle over his appointment to the rank of major general, which was finally confirmed on March 19, 1904. This drove him to seek military laurels to shore up his lack of field experience, sometimes leading the Provincial army on punitive expeditions against minor incidents that would have been better handled diplomatically by the district governors. The period of Wood's governorship had the hardest and bloodiest fighting of America's occupation of Moroland.

Some of the Moros fighting against the American troops were women who dressed exactly like men. This led to the song sung by American troops called "If a Lady's Wearin' Pantaloons".

=== Province under Leonard Wood (1903–1906) ===
Wood instituted many changes during his tenure as governor of Moro Province:

- On Wood's recommendation, the United States unilaterally abrogated the Kiram–Bates Treaty, citing continuing piracy and attacks on American personnel. The Sultan of Sulu was demoted to a purely religious office, with no more power than any other datu, and was provided with a small salary. The United States assumed direct control over Moroland.
- Slavery was abolished. Slave trading and raiding were repressed, but slaves were left with their owners. Wood announced that slaves were "at liberty to go and build homes for themselves wherever they like[d]," and pledged the military's protection for any former slaves that did so. Similar actions had been taken by individual commanders in the past, but Wood's edict had the backing of the Moro Council, lending it greater permanence.
- The Cedula Act of 1903 created an annual registration poll tax. This registration poll tax was highly unpopular with the Moros, since they interpreted it as a form of tribute. According to Hurley, participation in the Cedula was very low as late as 1933.
- The legal code of Moroland was reformed. Disputes between Moros and non-Christians were left to Moro laws and customs, with Philippine laws applying only to disputes with Christians. This led to a double standard, with a Moro who killed a Christian facing a stiff prison sentence, but with a Moro who killed another Moro facing only a maximum fine of 150 pesos. Wood attempted to codify Moro law, but there was simply too much variation in laws and customs among the different tribes and even among neighboring cottas. Wood placed the Moros under the Philippine criminal code, but enforcement proved difficult.
- Private land ownership was introduced in order to help the Moros transition to a more individualistic society from their traditional tribal society. Each family was given 40 acres (16 ha) of land, with datus given additional land in accordance with their status. Land sales had to be approved by the district governments in order to prevent fraud.
- An educational system was established. By June 1904, there were 50 schools with an average enrollment of 30 students each. Because of difficulties in finding teachers who spoke the native languages, classes were conducted in English after initial training in English. Many Moros were suspicious of the schools, but some offered buildings for use as schools.
- Trade was encouraged in order to give the Moros an alternative to fighting. Trade had been discouraged by banditry, piracy, and the possibility of intertribal disputes between Moro merchants and local customers. When trading with foreign merchants (usually maritime Chinese), a lack of warehousing made for a buyer's market, leading to low prices. Wood handled banditry and piracy by establishing military posts at river mouths in order to protect sea and land routes. Starting with a pilot project in Zamboanga, a system of Moro Exchanges was established. These exchanges provided Moro traders with warehouses and temporary housing in exchange for honoring a ban on fighting within the exchange. Bulletin-boards listed market prices in Hong Kong and Singapore, and the district governments guaranteed fair prices. These Exchanges proved highly successful and profitable, and provided a neutral ground for feuding datus to settle their differences.

==== Campaigns ====
Major military campaigns during Wood's governorship include:

- Wood's march around Lake Lanao during the fall of 1903 was an abortive attempt to replicate Pershing's earlier March.
- In October and November 1903, Wood personally led the Provincial Army to put down the Hassan uprising, which was led by the most powerful datu on the island of Jolo.
- In the spring of 1904, Wood destroyed or captured 130 cottas during the Battle of Taraca.
- Beginning in the spring of 1904 and continuing into the fall of 1905, American forces conducted a lengthy and massive manhunt for Datu Ali, the overlord of Cottabato Valley. Datu Ali had rebelled over Wood's anti-slavery policy. Engagements during this campaign include the Battle of Siranaya, the Simpetan massacre, and the Battle of the Malalag River.
- The First Battle of Bud Dajo was fought from March 5 to 7, 1906. An estimated 600 Muslims were killed, fighting a force of 800 Americans.

The Incident in the Philippines written by Mark Twain condemned the American massacre at Bud Dajo.

The American general Leonard Wood, responsible for the massacre of 900 Moro children, women, and men at Bud Dajo, was congratulated for his actions by US President Theodore Roosevelt, who said: "I congratulate you and the officers and men of your command upon the brilliant feat of arms, wherein you and they so well upheld the honor of the American flag." After being hit with dozens of rifle and pistol bullets, Moros continued to fight and kill US soldiers with their bladed weapons. The Moros' tenacity led to the creation of the Colt M1911 pistol, which fires .45 caliber cartridges.

=== Governorship of Tasker H. Bliss (1906–1909) ===
On February 1, 1906, Brigadier General Tasker H. Bliss replaced General Wood as the commander of the Department of Mindanao-Jolo, and replaced him as governor of Moro Province sometime after the First Battle of Bud Dajo. Bliss's tenure is regarded as a "peace era", and Bliss launched no punitive expeditions during his term in office. However, this superficial peace came at the price of tolerating a certain amount of lawlessness. Constabulary forces in pursuit of Moro fugitives often found themselves forced to abandon their chase after the fugitives took refuge at their home cottas. The constabulary forces were outnumbered, and a much larger (and disruptive) expedition would have been required to dislodge the fugitives from their hiding place. However, this period also demonstrated the success of new, aggressive American tactics. According to Rear Admiral D. P. Mannix, who fought the Moros as a young lieutenant from 1907 to 1908, the Americans exploited Muslim taboos by wrapping dead Moros in a pig's skin and "stuffing [their] mouth[s] with pork", thereby deterring the Moros from continuing with their suicide attacks.

=== Governorship of John J. Pershing (1909–1913) ===
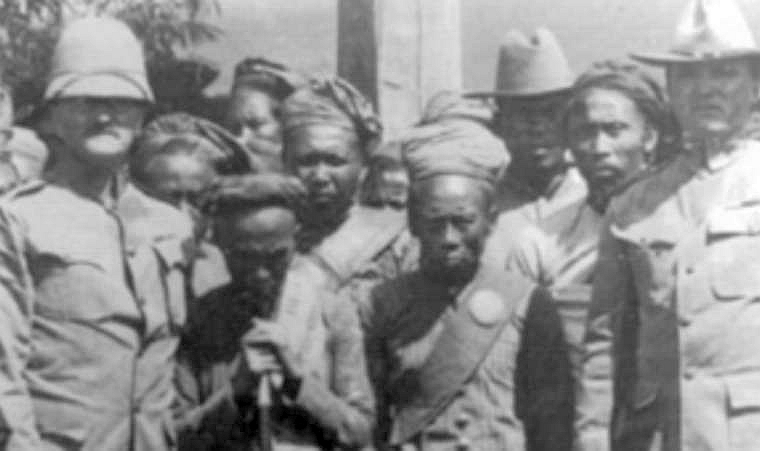
Cornelius C. Smith (far right), a recipient of the Medal of Honor, as commander of the Philippine Constabulary with Brigadier General John J. Pershing and Moro chieftains in 1910. Smith participated in expeditions against the Moro rebels for much of his time in the Philippines.

On November 11, 1909, Brigadier General John J. Pershing assumed his duties as the third and final military governor of Moro Province.

==== Reforms ====
Pershing enacted the following reforms during his tenure as governor:

- In order to extend the rule of law into the interior, Pershing stationed the Philippine Scouts in small detachments throughout the interior. This reduced crime and promoted agriculture and trade, at the cost of reduced military efficiency and troop training. The benefits of this reform outweighed the costs.
- The legal system was streamlined. Previously, trials had begun in the Court of First Instance, which convened every six months, and appeals to the Supreme Court in Manila often took more than a year. Pershing expanded the jurisdiction of the local ward courts, which were presided over by the district governors and secretaries, to include most civil cases and all criminal cases except for capital offenses. The Court of First Instance became the court of last resort. This reform was popular with the Moros because it was quick and simple, and it resembled their traditional unification of executive and judicial powers.
- Pershing promised to donate government land for the purposes of building Muslim houses of worship.
- Pershing recognized the practice of sacopy – indentured servitude in exchange for support and protection – as legitimate, but reaffirmed the government's opposition to involuntary slavery.
- Labor contract law was reformed in 1912. Defaults on contracts by workers or employers were no longer punishable unless there was intent to defraud or injure. Moros, at that time, were prone to absenteeism, which could lead to breach-of-contract suits.
- The economy of Moro Province continued to expand under Pershing. The three most important exports – hemp, copra, and lumber – increased 163% during his first three years, and Moros began to make bank deposits for the first time in their history.
- The Moro Exchange system was retained and was supplemented by Industrial Trading Stations. These stations operated in the interior, where merchants seldom went, and bought any non-perishable goods the Moros wished to sell. The stations also sold goods to the Moros at fair prices, preventing price gouging during famines.

==== Tactics ====
Pershing wrote the following in his autobiography about the juramentados:

[The] juramentado attacks were materially reduced in number by a practice the army had already adopted, one that the Mohammadans held in abhorrence. The bodies were publicly buried in the same grave with a dead pig. It was not pleasant to have to take such measures, but the prospect of going to hell instead of heaven sometimes deterred the would-be assassins.

Though this treatment was inflicted on captured juramentados, historians do not believe that Pershing was directly involved with such incidents, or that he personally gave such orders to his subordinates. Letters and memoirs from soldiers describing events similar to this do not provide credible evidence that Pershing was personally involved. However, some reports do say that Pershing was engaged in deliberate efforts to offend Muslim Filipinos' religious sensibilities, including an incident in which Pershing brought a pig's head to a ceasefire negotiation with a Muslim leader, though there is no evidence for the claim made by Donald Trump that Pershing executed Muslim insurgents with bullets dipped in pig's blood.

=== Surrender of arms ===
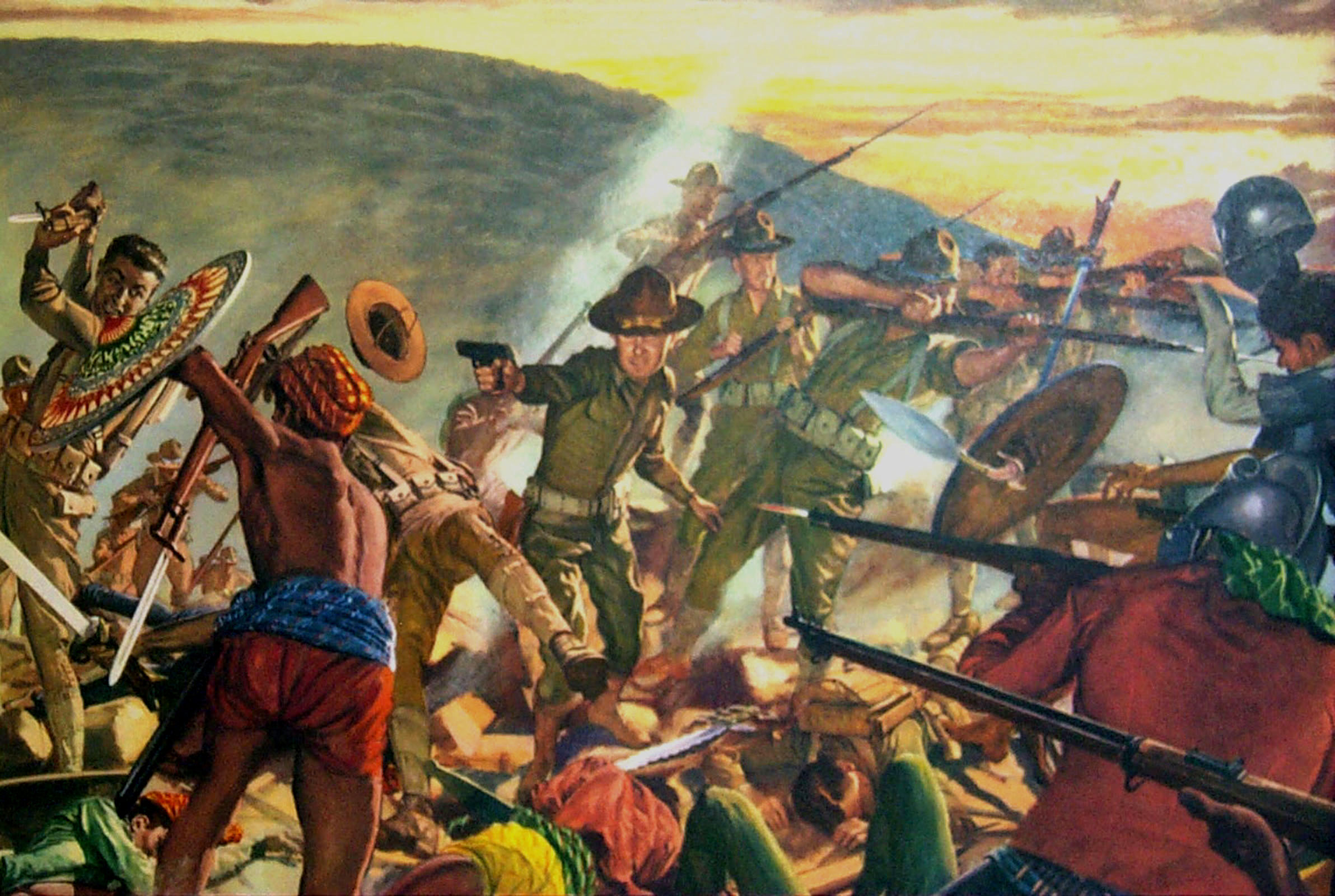
The four-day Battle of Bud Bagsak on the island of Jolo in 1913

Law enforcement in the Moro Province was difficult. Outlaws would go to ground at their home cottas, requiring an entire troop of police or soldiers to arrest them. There was always the danger of a full-fledged battle breaking out during such arrests, which led to many known outlaws going unpunished. In 1911, Pershing resolved to disarm the Moros. Army Chief of Staff Leonard Wood (former Moro Province governor) disagreed with this plan, stating that the move was ill-timed and that the Moros would hide their best arms, turning in only their worst. Pershing waited until roads into the interior had been completed so that government troops could protect disarmed Moros from holdouts. He conferred with the Datus, who mostly agreed that disarmament would be a good idea – provided that everybody disarmed.

Six weeks before putting his disarmament plan into action, Pershing informed Governor-General William Cameron Forbes, who agreed with the plan. Pershing did not consult or inform his commanding officer, Major General J. Franklin Bell. On September 8, 1911, Executive Order No. 24, ordering disarmament, was issued. The deadline for disarmament was December 1, 1911.

Resistance to disarmament was particularly fierce in the district of Jolo and led to the Second Battle of Bud Dajo (which, while involving roughly equivalent forces as the first battle, was far less bloody causing only 12 Moro casualties), and the Battle of Bud Bagsak. The latter battle, fought from June 11–15 1913, was the last major battle of the conflict, and is usually considered as marking the end of the rebellion. Smaller skirmishes between Moro bands and US troops were reported in the months following the battle, with the last of these clashes in Talipao in October 1913.

=== Transition to civil authority ===
By 1913, Pershing agreed that the Moro Province needed to transition to civil government. This was prompted by the Moros' personalistic approach to government, which was based on personal ties rather than a respect for an abstract office. To the Moros, a change of administration meant not just a change in leadership but a change in regime, and it was traumatic. Rotation within the military meant that each military governor could serve only for a limited time, and civil governors were needed to ensure a lengthy tenure in office. Until 1911, every district governor and secretary had been a military officer. By 1913, Pershing was the only military officer to hold a civil office.

In October 1913, Francis Burton Harrison was appointed Governor-General of the Philippines, and relieved Pershing of his position as governor of the Moro Province, replacing him with Frank Carpenter, a civilian official. In March 1915, Carpenter reached an agreement with Sultan Jamalul Kiram, under which Kiram relinquished all claims to political power over territories within the Philippines, resulting in the dissolution of the Sulu Sultanate and the United States gaining complete, uncontested control over the Philippine Islands.

Moro political opposition against the United States continued before shifting to sporadic armed resistance by 1927 up until 1941.

== Casualties ==
During the Moro Rebellion, the Americans suffered losses amounting to 130 killed and 323 wounded. Another 500 or so died of disease. The Philippine Scouts who augmented American forces during the campaign suffered 116 killed and 189 wounded. The Philippine Constabulary suffered heavily as well, with more than 1,500 losses sustained, of which half were fatalities.

On the Moro side, casualties were high as surrender was uncommon when Moros were engaged in combat.

Tausug fighters used improvised firearms, bows, spears, and barong or kalis swords against US troops with pistols, bolt-action Krag–Jørgensen and M1903 Springfield rifles, pump-action shotguns, Maxim machine guns, and mountain artillery.

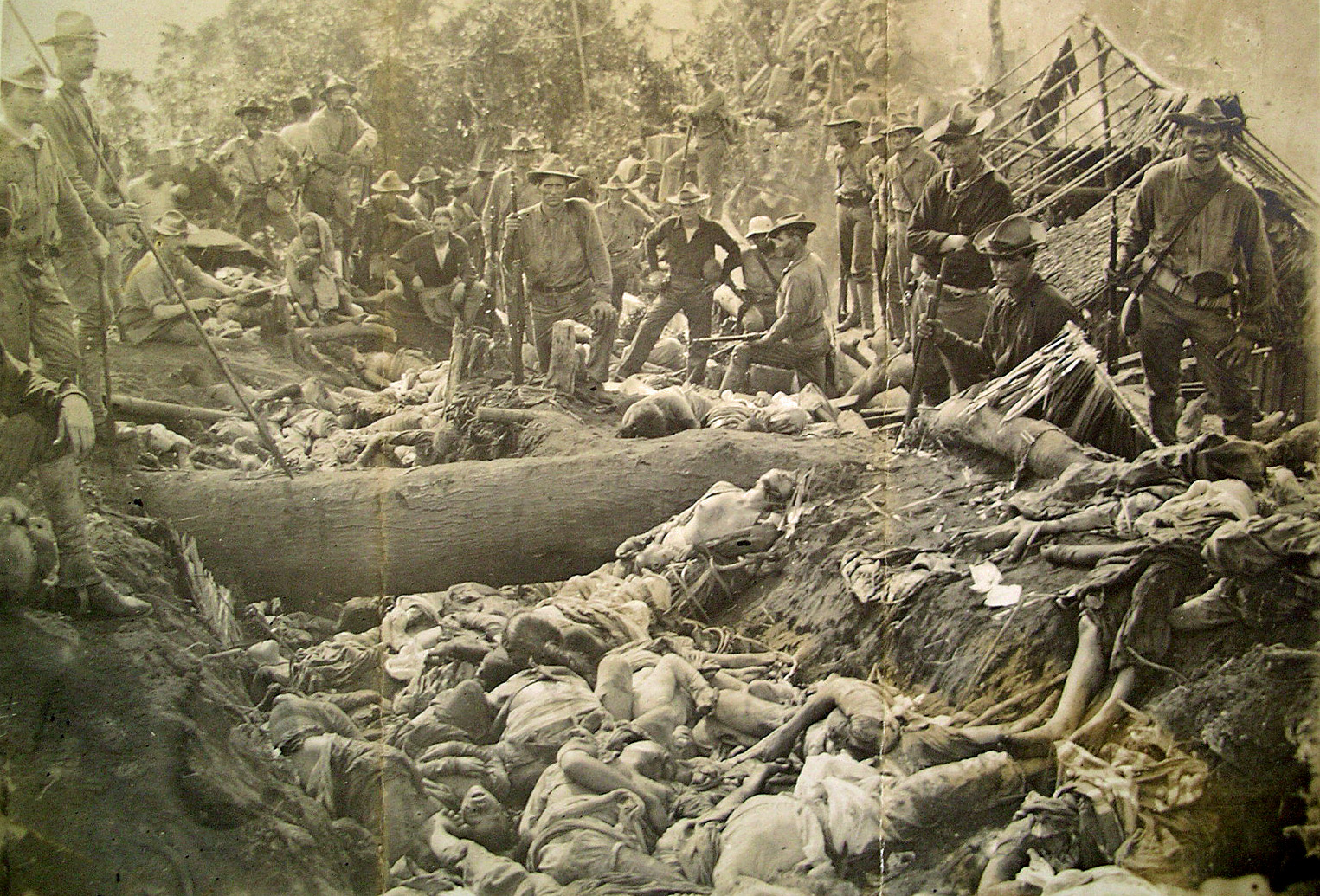
Aftermath of the First Battle of Bud Dajo

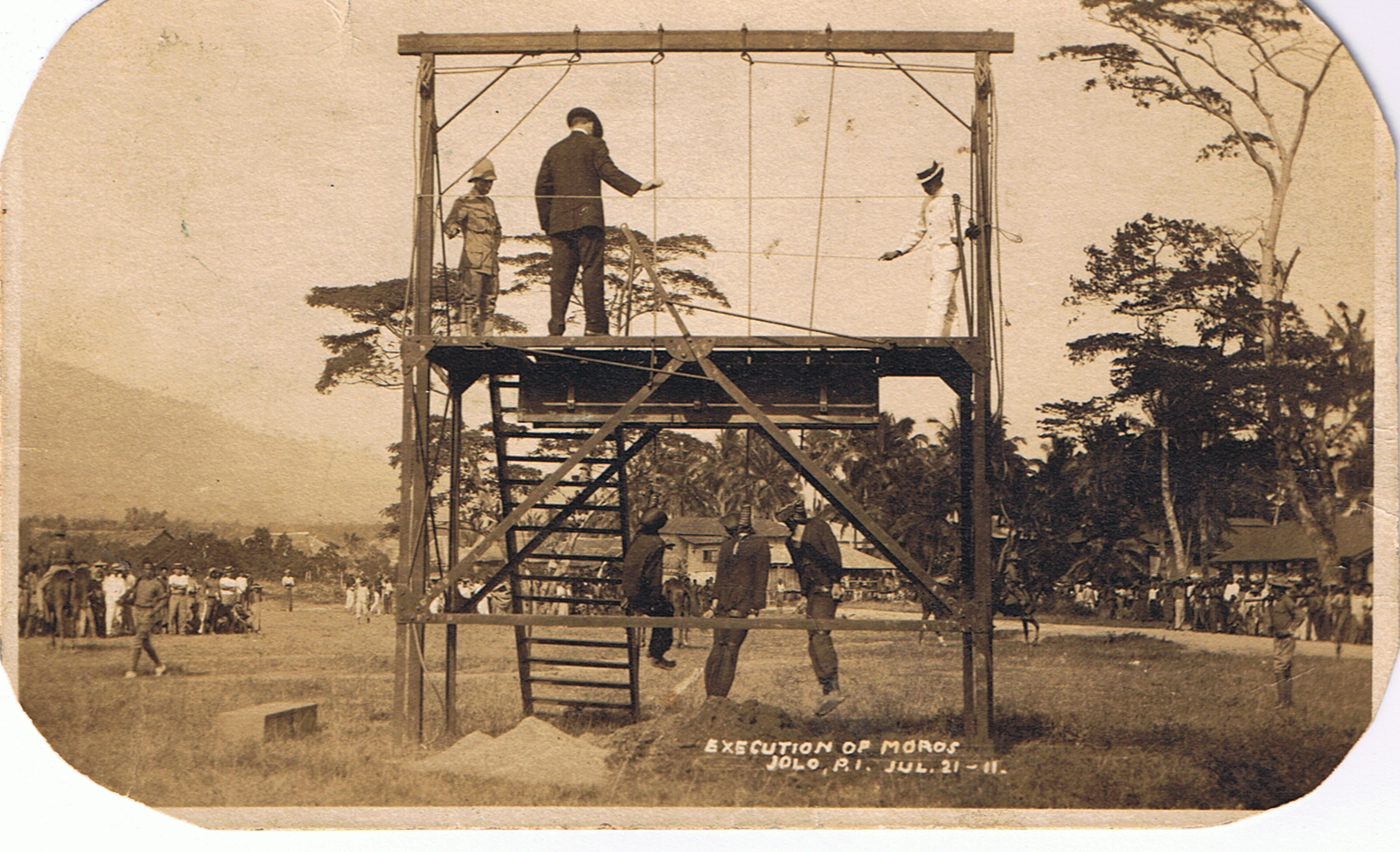
Three Moro rebels being hanged in Jolo, 21 July 1911

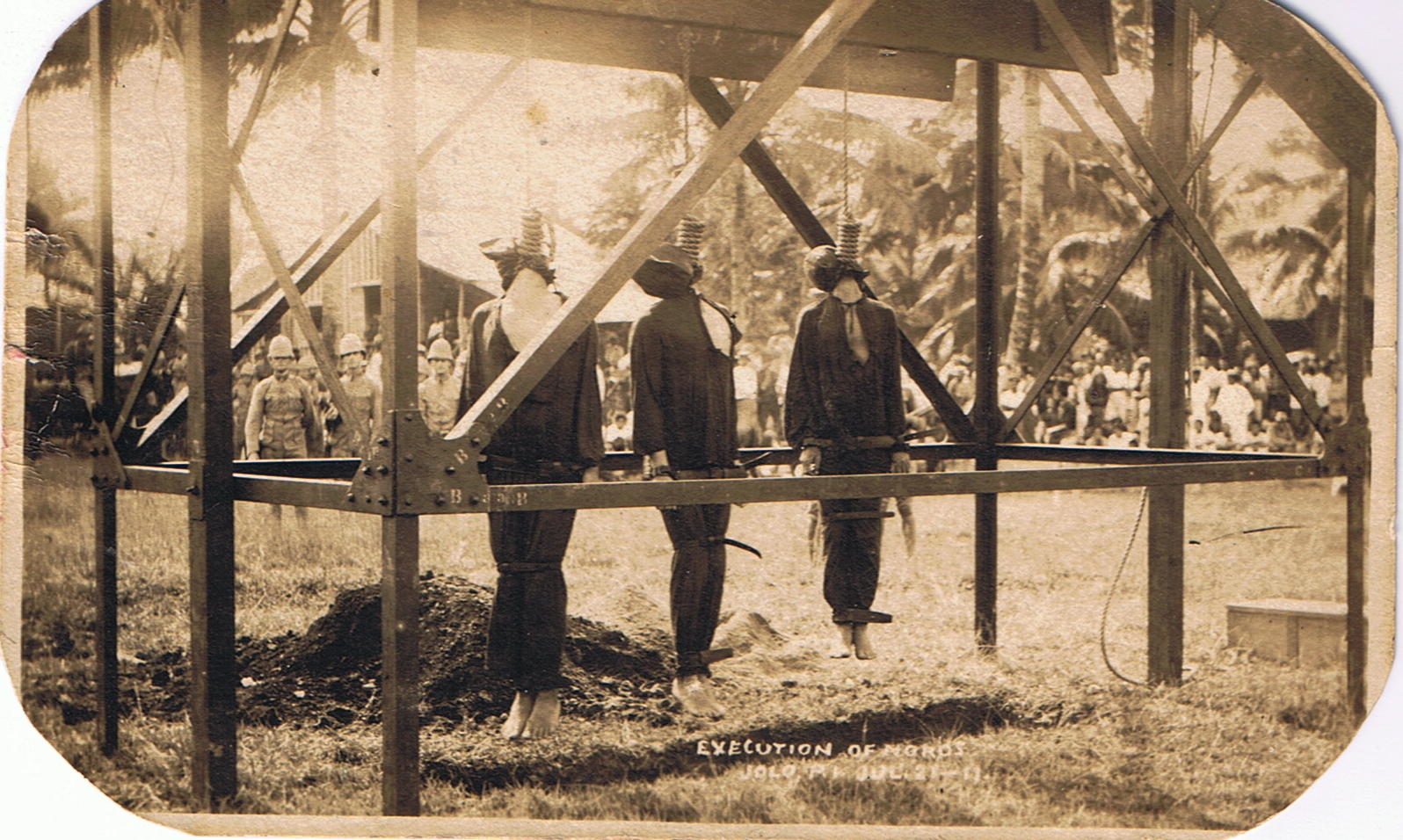
Three Moro rebels hanged in Jolo, 21 July 1911

== Juramentados and stopping power ==
In the Moro Rebellion, the Tausug Moro Muslim juramentados in suicide attacks continued to charge against American soldiers even after being shot. Panglima Hassan in the Hassan uprising was shot dozens of times before he was killed; however, other accounts suggest that he survived and was cared for by his relative, Panglima Bandahala ibn Sattiya Munoh, a trusted adviser and close family member of the Sultan. As a result, Americans elected to phase out the .38 caliber Colt M1892 revolver in favor of .45 caliber sidearms to continue their fight against the Moros. This led to the issuance of the Military version of the Colt Model 1878 revolver, dubbed the 1878/1902 "Alaskan" (a collectors term only), chambered in .45 Long Colt, and later the issuance of the M1909 revolver, chambered in .45 Colt (which would later again be rechambered in the weaker .45 ACP as the M1917). This contributed to the development and adoption of the .45 ACP M1911 semi-automatic pistol on March 29, 1911, after further weapon testing during the rebellion, beginning over 70 years of service by the pistol and cartridge in the US military.

Arrows, bayonets, guns, and kalis were used in often suicidal attacks by the Moros during their war with the Americans. Suicide attacks became more popular among Moros due to the overwhelming firepower of the Americans in conventional battles. Moro women took part in the resistance at the Battle of Bud Dajo against Major General Lenard Wood in 1906. Barbed wire proved to be of no impediment since Moro juramentado warriors managed to surge directly through it even as it ripped at their flesh and even as they were shot repeatedly with bullets. The Moros used barongs to inflict injuries upon American soldiers. Moros under Jikiri managed to survive in a cave under machine gun fire and Colt gunfire. Kalises and kampilans were used by Moros in fierce close-quarters combat against the Americans. Muskets were also used by the Moros. The Moros employed bayonets at close range when shooting was not possible according to the American journal The Field Artillery Journal, Volume 32. Americans were even charged at by Moros using spears. Moros fought to the death against Americans armed with rifles and artillery, while they themselves used only kalises at the crater battle.

Novels have been written describing juramentados deliberately impaling themselves on their bayonets in attempts to reach and kill American soldiers.

== Ottoman Empire's role ==
John Hay, the American Secretary of State, asked the ambassador to Ottoman Empire, Oscar Straus in 1899 to approach Ottoman Sultan Abdul Hamid II to request that the Sultan write a letter to the Moro Sulu Muslims of the Sulu Sultanate in the Philippines telling them to submit to American suzerainty and American military rule. Despite the sultan's "pan-Islamic" ideology, he readily aided the American forces because he felt no need to cause hostilities between the West and Muslims.

Abdul Hamid wrote the letter, which was sent to Mecca where two Sulu chiefs brought it home to Sulu. It was successful, and the "Sulu Mohammedans ... refused to join the insurrectionists and had placed themselves under the control of [the American] army, thereby recognizing American sovereignty." John P. Finley wrote that:

After due consideration of these facts, the Sultan, as Caliph caused a message to be sent to the Mohammedans of the Philippine Islands forbidding them to enter into any hostilities against the Americans, inasmuch as no interference with their religion would be allowed under American rule. As the Moros have never asked more than that, it is not surprising, that they refused all overtures made, by Aguinaldo's agents, at the time of the Filipino insurrection. President McKinley sent a personal letter of thanks to Mr. Straus for the excellent work he had done, and said, its accomplishment had saved the United States at least twenty thousand troops in the field. If the reader will pause to consider what this means in men and also the millions in money, he will appreciate this wonderful piece of diplomacy, in averting a holy war.

President William McKinley did not mention the Ottoman Empire's role in the pacification of the Sulu Moros in his address to the first session of the Fifty-sixth Congress in December 1899 since the agreement with the Sultan of Sulu was not submitted to the Senate until December 18.

== In popular culture ==
- Vic Hurley's history of the Moros, Swish of the Kris The Story of the Moros tells the story of Colonel Alexander Rodgers using pigs to subdue the Moros in the Philippines. Hurley wrote that Rodgers was known as "the Pig" to the Moros. And another Hurley book The Jungle Patrol: The Story of the Philippine Constabulary, also relates the story of pigs being used against them.
- Hurley wrote the screenplay for the Hollywood film The Real Glory in 1937; the film was released in 1939. It was based on a 1937 novel of the same name by Charles L. Clifford, Hurley's pen name. The film served as American military propaganda, portraying the US Army as brave defenders of the local population being terrorized by the Moros, whom the film depicts as bloodthirsty raiders oppressing the local Christian Filipino community. The film showed one Moro juramentado causing 60 Filipino soldiers to cower in fear, which was protested by Philippine President Manuel Quezon. In one scene of the movie, Gary Cooper as Dr. Bill Canavan threatens to bury a captive Moro in a pigskin so to prevent the Moro from entering paradise upon death; this scene was censored from the movie during World War II due to the Moros being US allies against the Japanese.

== See also ==
- Moros during World War II
- Spanish–Moro conflict
- Moro conflict
  - Jabidah massacre
