= The Real Glory =

1939 film

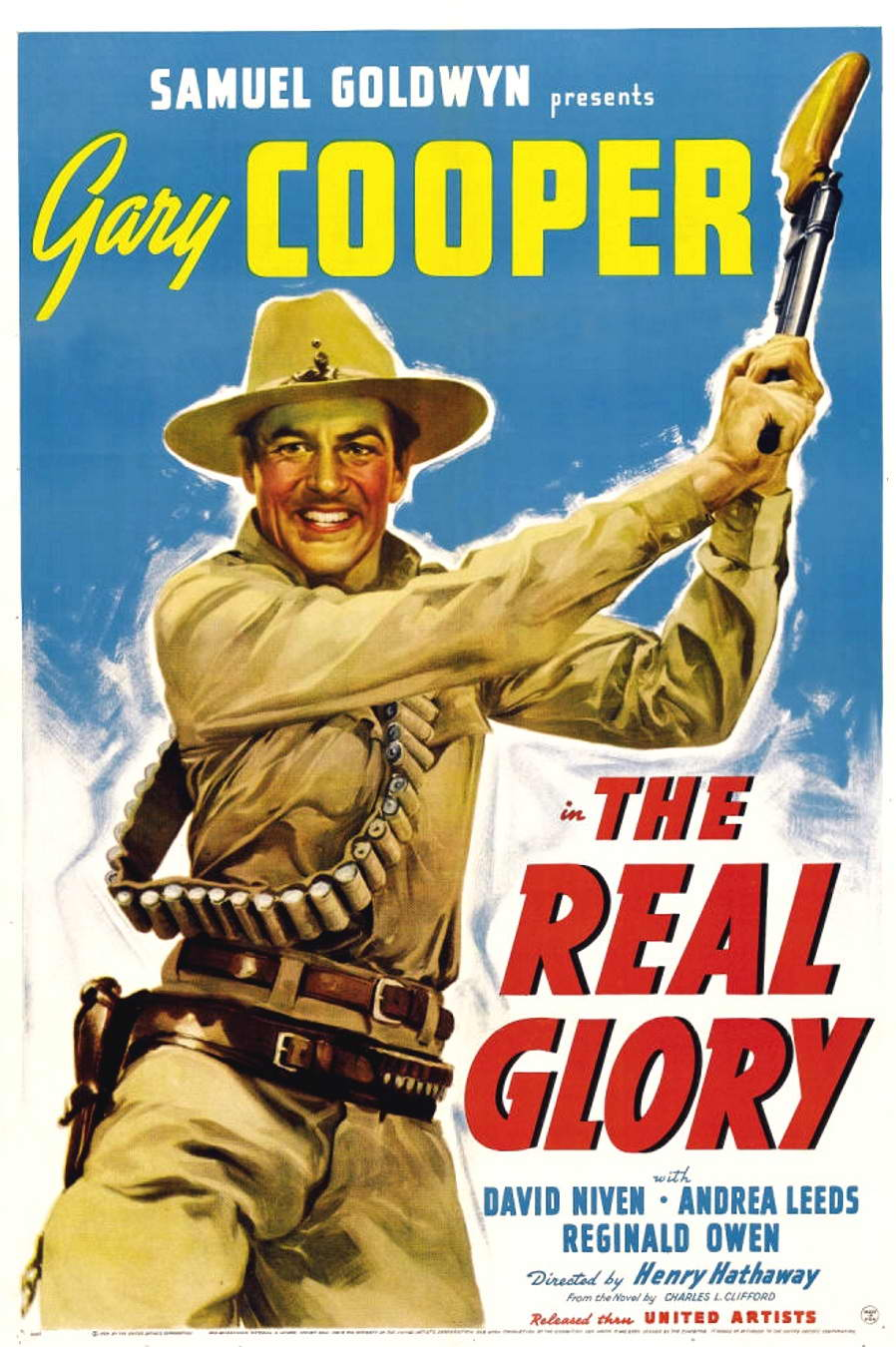
- Theatrical release poster
- Directed by: Henry Hathaway
- Screenplay by: Jo Swerling; Robert Presnell Sr.
- Based on: Based on The Real Glory by Charles L. Clifford
- Produced by: Samuel Goldwyn
- Starring: Gary Cooper; David Niven; Andrea Leeds; Reginald Owen; Broderick Crawford
- Cinematography: Rudolph Maté
- Edited by: Daniel Mandell
- Music by: Alfred Newman
- Production company: Samuel Goldwyn Productions
- Distributed by: United Artists
- Release date: September 29, 1939 (U.S.)
- Running time: 96 minutes
- Country: United States
- Language: English
- Budget: $2 million

The Real Glory is a 1939 Samuel Goldwyn Productions adventure film starring Gary Cooper, David Niven, Andrea Leeds and Broderick Crawford released by United Artists in the weeks immediately following Nazi Germany's invasion of Poland. Based on a 1937 novel of the same name by Charles L. Clifford and directed by Henry Hathaway, the film is set against the backdrop of the Moro Rebellion during the American occupation of the Philippines at the beginning of the 20th century. According to The World news broadcast on Aug 18, 2017, the US War Department withdrew the film in 1942. The Moros were US allies in World War II, and the film had inflammatory scenes including threatening a Muslim prisoner with burial wrapped in a pig skin.

== Plot ==
In 1906, Alipang and his Muslim Moro guerrillas are terrorizing the people of the Philippine island of Mindanao, raiding villages, killing the men, and carrying off the women and children for slaves. Instead of maintaining garrisons indefinitely to protect the Filipinos, the United States Army tests out a new tactic at Fort Mysang. The army detachment is replaced by a handful of officers – Colonel Hatch, Captains Manning and Hartley, and Lieutenants McCool and Larsen – who are to train the native Philippine Constabulary to take over the burden. Army doctor Lieutenant Canavan is sent along to keep them healthy. They are welcomed by a skeptical Padre Rafael.

Alipang starts sending fanatical juramentados to assassinate the officers and goad them into attacking before the natives are fully trained. Hatch is the first victim, leaving Manning to take command. Manning's wife and Hartley's daughter Linda arrive for a visit at the worst possible time; a horrified Mrs. Manning witnesses her husband's murder. Hartley takes charge, but Canavan disagrees with his by-the-book, overcautious approach. Disobeying orders, Canavan sets out for Alipang's camp guided by Miguel, a young Moro boy he has befriended. "Mike" (as Canavan calls him) infiltrates the camp and learns that Alipang has sent another assassin, this time for Hartley. Canavan and Mike intercept the man and take him back a prisoner.

Linda and Canavan fall in love, much to the disappointment of McCool and Larsen. When Hartley insists she leave Mysang with Mrs. Manning, she refuses and helps out at the hospital.

Alipang then dams the river on which the villagers depend. Hartley refuses to send a detachment into the jungle to blow it up (he is concealing the fact that he is slowly going blind from an old head wound). The people have to rely on an old well, but the contaminated water causes a cholera epidemic. Finally, Hartley has no choice but to send Larsen and some men to destroy the dam. They do not return.

The Datu, a supposedly friendly Moro leader, offers to guide Hartley and his men to the dam, but he is actually leading them into an ambush. Canavan learns of the Datu's treachery from Mike, the sole survivor of Larsen's detachment, and races to warn Hartley. Canavan forces the Datu to take him to the dam. The Datu is killed in a booby trap, but Canavan manages to dynamite the dam anyway. Then, he and the men raft back to the village, which is under attack by Alipang's men.

McCool is killed leading the defense, but Canavan and the rest return in time to turn the tide. Alipang is killed by Filipino Lieutenant Yabo, who declines to use a gun and kills Alipang in hand-to-hand combat.Their mission accomplished, the Hartleys and Canavan depart, leaving the village in Yabo's care.

== Cast ==
- Gary Cooper as Dr. Bill Canavan
- David Niven as Lieutenant Terence McCool
- Andrea Leeds as Linda Hartley
- Reginald Owen as Captain Steve Hartley
- Broderick Crawford as Lieutenant Larsen. Crawford was cast against type as a good-natured orchid fancier.
- Kay Johnson as Mrs. Mabel Manning
- Russell Hicks as Captain George Manning
- Vladimir Sokoloff as the Datu
- Benny Inocencio as Miguel (Mike)
- Charles Waldron as Padre Rafael
- Rudy Robles as Lieutenant Yabo
- Tetsu Komai as Alipang
- Roy Gordon as Colonel Hatch
- Henry Kolker as the General
- Elvira Ríos as Mrs. Yabo (uncredited)

== Production ==
Sam Goldwyn bought the screen rights to Charles Clifford's story on 28 October 1936. It was unsure who the star would be – possibilities included Joel McCrea and Gary Cooper, who both had deals with Goldwyn – but Walter Brennan was announced as the second lead. Goldwyn sought a meeting with Philippine President Manuel L. Quezon to get his government's cooperation in shooting the film. Goldwyn wanted to make the film in color.

In June 1938, Goldwyn signed a contract with Paramount to borrow director Henry Hathaway for three films, the first of which was to be The Real Glory. Goldwyn assigned Gary Cooper to star as he and Hathaway had successfully made Lives of a Bengal Lancer (1935) together. The film was also known as The Last Frontier. Cooper was placed under exclusive contract to Goldwyn.

Filming took place in April 1939. There were considerable troubles finding and managing the Filipino extras. Reginald Owen replaced Donald Crisp.

The Philippine government reportedly requested changes to the film, due to the depiction of Philippine soldiers as cowards, which were denied. However the government later said they made no such suggestions.

== Burial in a pig skin ==
In one scene, Padre Rafael tells Dr. Canavan that the Moros are afraid of burial in a pig skin. In a later scene, Dr. Canavan threatens a Moro prisoner with this, and a pig skin is laid on the ground in front of the prisoner. This episode echoes a report in General John J. Pershing's memoir My Life Before the World War that a Muslim fighter had been "publicly buried in the same grave with a dead pig". There is a related, but widely discredited, claim that Pershing had threatened to execute Muslim Moro prisoners with bullets dipped in pigs' blood. The historian Brian McAllister Linn wrote that it was unlikely that Pershing was involved in or had ordered others to commit religiously insulting acts, and that the episode in The Real Glory had probably fueled the myth. This claim concerning bullets dipped in pigs' blood was referred to by Donald Trump in a presidential campaign speech in February 2016 and in a tweet following the terrorist attacks in Barcelona on August 17, 2017. On the other hand, evidence from Rear Admiral Daniel P. Mannix III supports the claim of the Americans burying Moros in pig skins.

== Notes and references ==
=== References ===
- Isaac, Allan Punzalan (2006). American Tropics: Articulating Filipino America. Critical American Studies. Minneapolis: University of Minnesota Press. p. 205. ISBN 0-8166-4274-5.
- Hathaway, Henry; Rudy Behlmer; Polly Platt (2001). Henry Hathaway. Rowman & Littlefield. p. 281. ISBN 978-0-8108-3972-4.
- Holsinger, M. Paul (1999). War and American Popular Culture. Greenwood Publishing Group. p. 479. ISBN 978-0-313-29908-7.
- Rosenberg, Ralph; Robert Karen (1986). When the Shooting Stops, the Cutting Begins. De Capo. p. 310. ISBN 978-0-306-80272-0.
- Variety Film Review (January 1, 1939). "The Real Glory". Variety.
- Nugent, Frank S. (September 15, 1939). "A Whopping Picture Is 'The Real Glory' With Gary Cooper, at the Rivoli". New York Times. Archived from the original on November 19, 2018.
- Feaster, Felicia. "The Real Glory". Spotlight. Turner Classic Movies.
- United States Copyright Office Staff (2007) [1964]. "Clifford, Charles L.". United States Copyright Office, The Catalog of Copyright Renewal Records. Washington, D.C.: Kessinger Publishing. p. 204. ISBN 978-1-4325-1237-8.
- Woolf, Christopher (August 18, 2017). "Trump cites an urban legend about Gen. Pershing's fight with primarily Muslim insurgents". pri.org. The World.
