= Second Battle of Bud Dajo =

1911 battle of the Moro Rebellion

- Part of the Moro Rebellion
Date	December 18–26, 1911
Location	Bud Dajo, Jolo Island, Philippines
Result	American victory Total annexation of the Philippines

Belligerents
United States	Moro rebels

Commanders and leaders
John J. Pershing	Unknown

Strength
1,256	800

Casualties and losses
3 wounded	12

The Second Battle of Bud Dajo was a counterinsurgency action fought by American soldiers against native Moros in December 1911, during the Moro Rebellion phase of the Philippine–American War.

On November 11, 1909, Major General John J. Pershing assumed his duties as governor of the Moro province. On September 8, 1911, he issued Executive Order No. 24, which ordered the complete disarmament of all Moros. American soldiers experienced juramentado and amok attacks from Moros opposed to American rule. Pershing saw total disarmament as the solution to maintain American rule. The deadline for disarmament was December 1, 1911.

The attempted enforcement of this order brought about the Second Battle of Bud Dajo. In December 1911, an estimated 800 Moros fortified the top of the dormant volcano, a sacred site for refuge. Pershing, realizing the Moros had not time to provision their fortress, used two infantry battalions, a machine gun platoon, six troops of the 2nd Cavalry, a field artillery battery, five companies of the Philippine Scouts, and a company of Moro Constabulary. Pershing, through negotiations, succeeded in persuading the majority of the assembled Moros to return home.

== See also ==
- First Battle of Bud Dajo
