= Lake Seit =

Volcanic lake in the Philippines

Coordinates: 5°59′16″N 121°12′39″E

Lake Seit, also spelled Siit or Siet, is a volcanic lake on the island of Jolo in the Philippines.
