= Jolo =

Island of the Philippines

Native name: Sūg / Lupa' Sūg سُوْݢْ/لُفَأْ سُوْݢْ
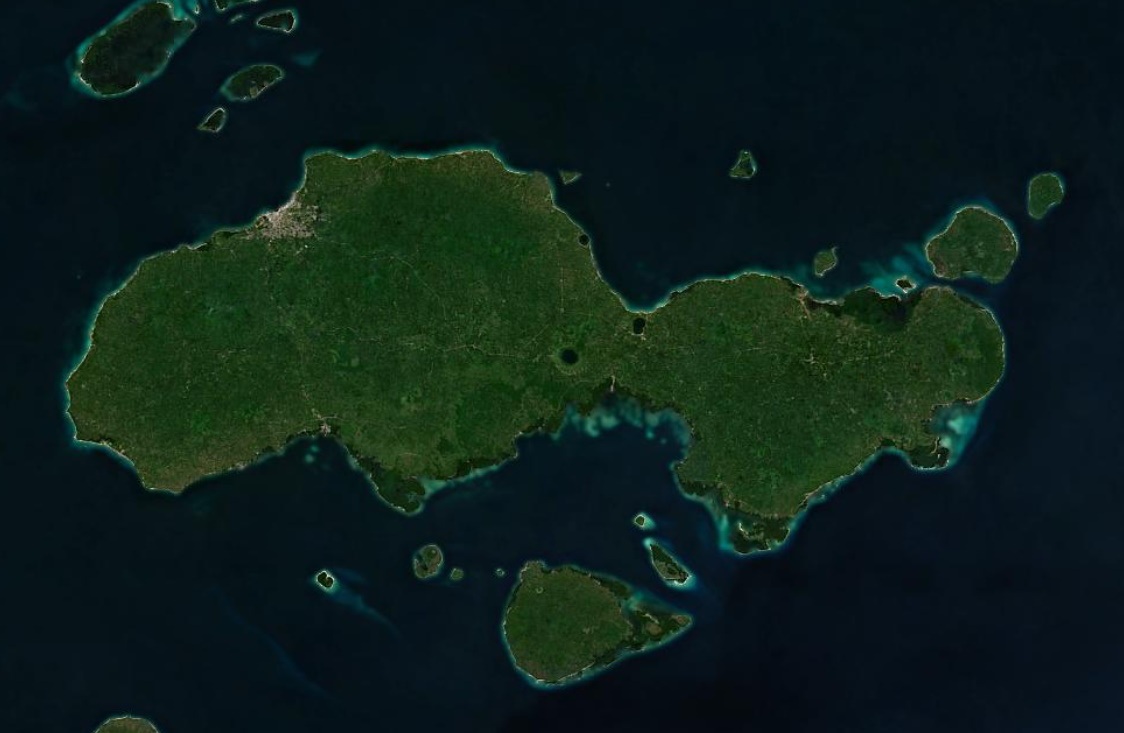
- Satellite image of Jolo

- Location within Philippines

Geography
- Coordinates: 5°58′23″N 121°9′0″E
- Archipelago: Sulu archipelago
- Adjacent to: Celebes Sea; Sulu Sea
- Major islands: Basilan; Jolo; Tawi-tawi
- Area: 869 km^{2} (336 sq mi)
- Highest elevation: 803 m (2635 ft)
- Highest point: Mount Tumatangis

Administration
- Philippines
- Region: Zamboanga Peninsula
- Province: Sulu
- Municipalities: Indanan; Jolo; Kalingalan Caluang; Luuk; Maimbung; Old Panamao; Panglima Estino; Parang; Patikul; Talipao
- Largest settlement: Jolo (pop. 87,998)

Demographics
- Population: 152,067 (2024)
- Pop. density: 515.6/km^{2} (1335.4/sq mi)
- Ethnic groups: Banguingui; Bajau; Suluk/Tausug; Zamboangueño

Additional information

Jolo (Tausug: Sūg) is a volcanic island in the southwest Philippines and the primary island of the province of Sulu, on which the capital of the same name is situated. It is located in the Sulu Archipelago, between Borneo and Mindanao, and has a population of approximately 500,000 people.

The island is the location of the Jolo Group of Volcanoes, an active volcanic group, and contains numerous volcanic cones and craters, including the active Bud Dajo cinder cone. It had been the headquarters of militants from the terrorist group Abu Sayyaf; however, the group is now disbanded.

== History ==
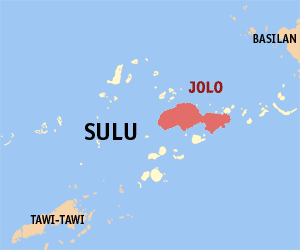
Location within Sulu province

After a series of less-than-successful attempts during the centuries of Spanish rule in the Philippines, Spanish forces captured the city of Jolo, the seat of the Sultan of Sulu, in 1876.

In that year, the Spanish launched a massive campaign to occupy Jolo. Spurred by the need to curb slave raiding once and for all and worried about the presence of other Western powers in the south (the British had established trading centers in Jolo by the 19th century and the French were offering to purchase Basilan Island from the cash strapped government in Madrid, Spain), the Spanish made a final bid to consolidate their rule in this southern frontier. On 21 February of that year, the Spaniards assembled the largest contingent against Jolo, consisting of 9,000 soldiers, in 11 transports, 11 gunboats, and 11 steamboats. Headed by Admiral José Malcampo, the contingent captured Jolo and established a Spanish settlement with Capt. Pascual Cervera was appointed to set up a garrison and serve as military governor; he served from March 1876 to December 1876, followed by Brig. Gen. Jose Paulin (December 1876 – April 1877), Col. Carlos Martinez (Sept 1877 – Feb 1880), Col. Rafael de Rivera (1880–1881), Col. Isidro G. Soto (1881–1882), Col. Eduardo Bremon, (1882), Col. Julian Parrado (1882–1884), Col. Francisco Castilla (1884–1886), Col. Juan Arolas (1886–1893), Col. Caesar Mattos (1893), Gen. Venancio Hernandez (1893–1896) and Col. Luis Huerta (1896–1899).

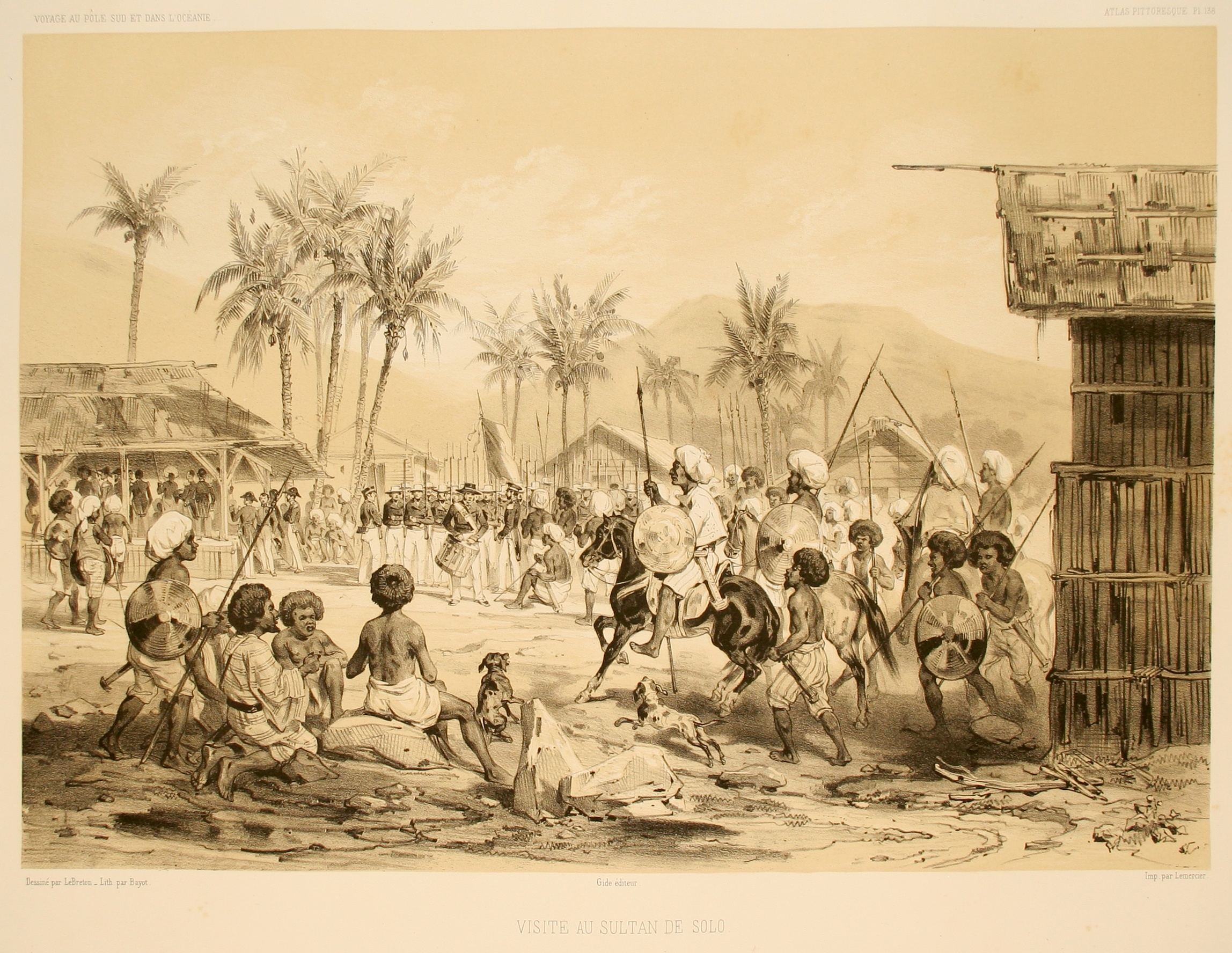
French explorer Jules Dumont d'Urville visiting the Sultan of Jolo

By 1878, the Spaniards had fortified Jolo with a perimeter wall and tower gates, built inner forts called Puerta Blockaus, Puerta España, and Puerta Alfonso XII, and two outer fortifications named Princesa de Asturias and Torre de la Reina. Troops, including a cavalry with its own lieutenant commander, were garrisoned within the protective confines of the walls. In 1880, appointed Governor Colonel Rafael Gonzales de Rivera dispatched the 6th Regiment from Jolo to the Siasi and Bongao islands. The Spaniards were not secure in their stronghold because it would be sporadically attacked. On 22 July 1883, it is reported that three unnamed juramentado succeeded in penetrating the Jolo town plaza and killed three Spaniards. The word "Ajuramentado" was coined by Spanish colonel Juan Arolas after witnessing several such acts while serving duty in Jolo garrison.

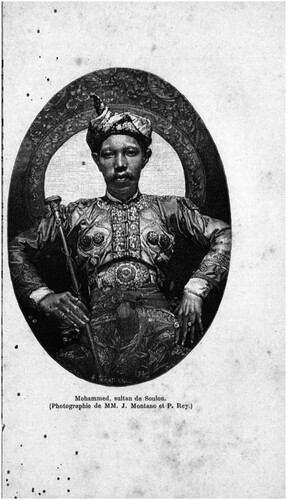
1879 photo of Sultan Jamalul Azam, Sultan of Sulu from 1862 to 1881

The Spanish and the Sultan of Sulu signed the Treaty of Peace on 22 July 1878, (Note: Controversy exists over terminology used in the Spanish-language and Tausug-language versions of the treaty and whether Spain was given complete sovereignty over the Sulu archipelago, including Basilan, or whether a "protectorate-ship" was entered into) but Jolo Island and Tawi-tawi remained partially ruled by the Spanish as their sovereignty was limited to military stations and garrisons and pockets of civilian settlements.

The Americans arrived in 1899, and by the turn of the century, the Philippine–American War was raging in Luzon. To avoid spreading their forces too thin, the Americans employed the classic divide-and-rule tactic.

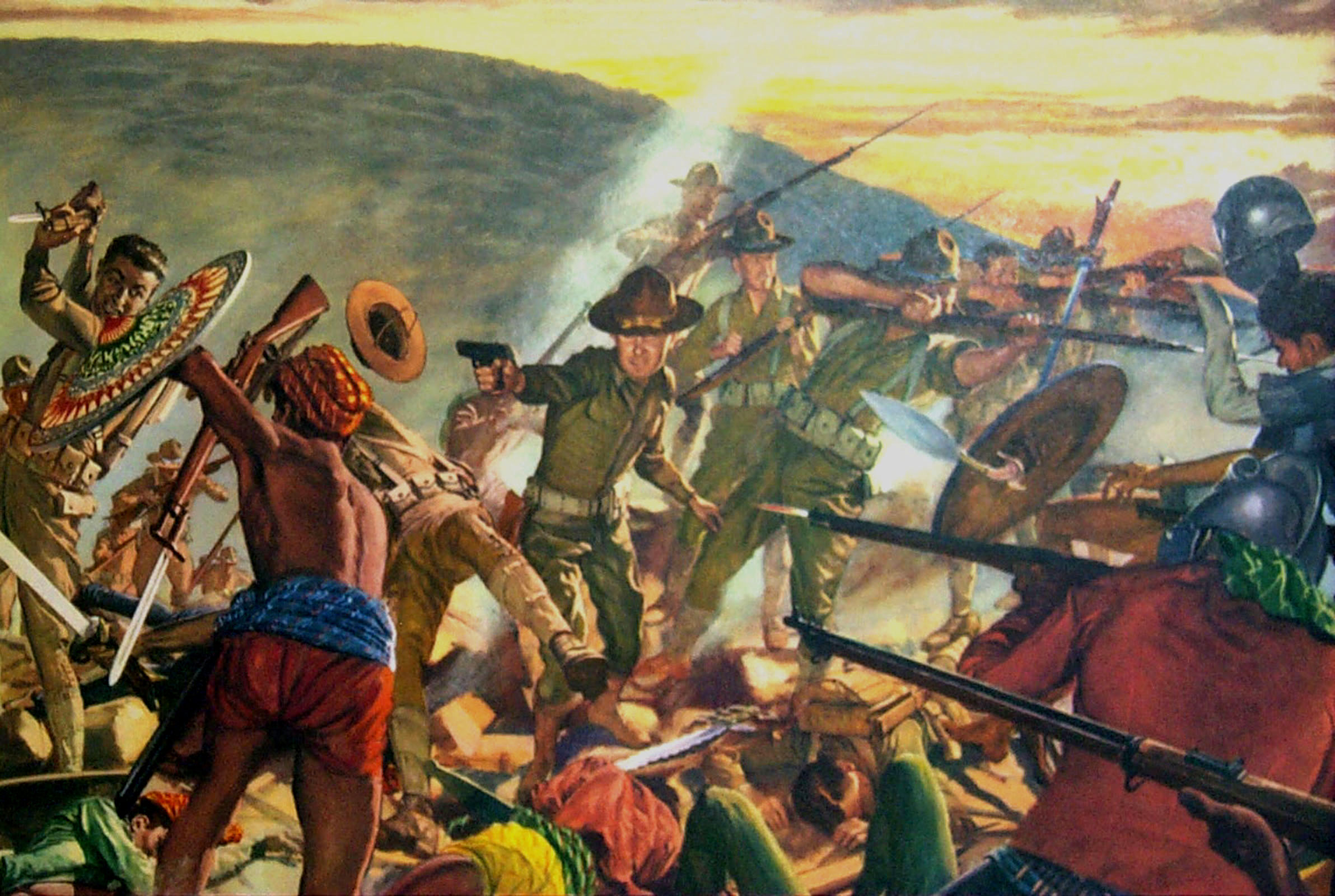
The four-day Battle of Bud Bagsak in 1913

Initially, Sultan Kiram was disappointed by the handover of control to the Americans and had expected to regain sovereignty over the Sulu archipelago after the Spanish defeat. Brig. General John C. Bates's main goal, though, was to guarantee the Sultanate's neutrality in the Philippine–American War and to establish order in Mindanao. After some negotiations, the Bates Treaty was signed.

This treaty was based on the earlier Spanish treaty. It retained the translation discrepancy: the English version described a complete dependency, while the Tausug version described a protectorate. Although the Bates Treaty granted more powers to the Americans than the original Spanish treaty, the treaty was still criticized in America for granting too much autonomy to the Sultan. One particular clause, which recognized the Moro practice of slavery, also raised eyebrows in Washington, D.C. Bates later admitted that the treaty was merely a stop-gap measure, signed only to buy time until the war in the north was ended and more forces could be brought to bear in the south. The peace created by the Bates Treaty did not last, however. This became evident when the Muslims repudiated the Moro province, a politico-military government in Mindanao lasting from 1903 to 1914, and the Moro Rebellion soon broke out. Two months before the creation of the Moro province, the American colonial government declared all unoccupied lands public lands. Immediately after the declaration, American investments entered Mindanao, and mass migration of Christians was encouraged. Severina Luna de Orosa and her husband Sixto Orosa were the first Christian doctors to work in Jolo, bringing western medicine to the region.

Tulay Central Mosque in Jolo

The Japanese occupied Jolo during World War II. On 2 April 1945, the 2nd Battalion of the U.S. 163rd Regiment, 41st Division (formerly the Montana National Guard) landed at Sanga Sanga and Bongao in the Sulu Archipelago, halfway between the island of Borneo and the Philippines. A week later, the other two battalions of the regiment left Mindanao and landed at Jolo, where they began fighting their way up heavily defended Mount Daho, the highest point on the island. The Sultan of Jolo, Muhammad Janail Abirin the 2nd, leader of the archipelago's 300,000 Muslims, welcomed Col. William J. Moroney, commander of the 163rd, and promised to help rid the island of the Japanese. In three weeks of combat, the 163rd suffered 37 dead and 191 wounded. Approximately 2,600 Japanese troops were killed, and only 87 Japanese soldiers were captured or surrendered in Jolo. Local fighters killed many Japanese stragglers hiding in the jungle after the Imperial Army surrendered in August 1945.

Fighting on the island flared up again in February 2005 when between 4,000 and 5,000 Philippine troops clashed with around 800 Islamist militants from the Abu Sayyaf group, along with followers of Nur Misuari. Up to 12,000 people were thought to have fled the fighting. Fighting is continuing today.

On 27 January 2019 the Cathedral of Our Lady of Mount Carmel in Jolo was bombed.

== Kidnappings ==
On November 14, 1993, American Christian linguist Charles Watson was kidnapped by Abu Sayyaf. Watson was released about one month later.

On 22 September 2015, Kjartan Sekkingstad, age 56, from Sotra, Norway, was abducted by Abu Sayyaf Islamist guerrillas from a high-end tourist resort on Samal Island, along with 2 Canadian men, John Ridsdel, age 68, and Robert Hall, age 67, and a Filipina woman, Marites Flor, Hall's girlfriend. In April and June 2016, the Canadians were beheaded after ransoms were not paid, and in June 2016, Flor was released. On 17 September 2016, Sekkingstad was released on Jolo island, about 600 miles south of Manila, after Islamist captor Abu Sayyaf received $638,000 in ransom for his release. He was handed over to the rebel group Moro National Liberation Front (MNLF). The MNLF is in peace talks with the government and has been working with authorities to secure his release. It is not known who paid the ransom, but it was not the Norwegian authorities.

== In popular culture ==
In the American film Plane (2023), an airliner makes an emergency landing on this island, with the survivors having to deal with local terrorists.

== See also ==
- List of active volcanoes in the Philippines
- List of potentially active volcanoes in the Philippines
- List of inactive volcanoes in the Philippines
- List of islands of the Philippines
- Philippine Institute of Volcanology and Seismology
- Jolo, Sulu
