= Vic Hurley =

American writer and expert on the Philippines (1898–1978)

Gerald Victor Hurley (1898–1978) was a record-breaking athlete, adventurer, expert on the Philippine Islands, military officer, and prolific author. His published books include a non-fiction series relating to the Philippine Islands in the first third of the twentieth century, military histories, screenplays, articles and works of fiction.

== Biography ==
Hurley was born in Springfield, Missouri, on October 6, 1898. He grew up and graduated from high school in the remote Eastern Washington community of Davenport and was introduced to the broader world through his Army service in World War I. He enlisted in the Army in 1916 and saw action with one of the first field artillery units sent overseas. He and his unit were engaged in every major battle of the war including Verdun and Belleau Wood. He suffered a lifelong chronic illness resulting from a mustard gas attack.

At the University of Washington, on his return from service in the early 1920s, he became a track star, setting records, some of which were not broken until 1984. He competed against Charley Paddock, the American Olympic star, in the early 1920s. Hurley was an All-American track star, placing fifth in the 1921 NCAA championships in the 100-yard dash. His record at UW was finally bested by Phil Shinnick after 42 years. In 1923 he was recruited by the Illinois Athletic Club for their track team and was employed by American Express in Chicago for two years.

In 1925 he traveled to the Philippine Islands, earning passage as a stoker on a steamship. He and a partner began a coconut plantation in the jungle interior of Mindanao Island in 1926. His partner soon abandoned him and left him, a solitary white man, in the jungle, to pursue this enterprise which after a year failed. When he recovered his health he stayed in Zamboanga for another seven years as an expatriate manager for American companies. While there he married Betty Hitchman in Manila 1930. During that time he became an honorary Third Lieutenant in the Philippine Constabulary, the Philippine national police force. Hurley and his wife returned to the U.S. in April 1934 on the ship President Wilson and appear on the 1940 census in Seattle with Betty listed as a social visitor and Gerald as an author.

On the recommendation of a college friend, Max Miller—the author of I Cover the Waterfront (1933), Hurley recounted his plantation adventure and its failure in Southeast of Zamboanga, (1935) . Subsequently he described his life as an American expatriate in the tiny occidental enclave in Zamboanga, Men in Sun Helmets (1936), his experience with the native Islamic Filipinos, the Moros, and their history in Swish of the Kris (1938), and the genesis and history of the Philippine Constabulary in Jungle Patrol. All of Hurley’s Philippine books were published by E. P. Dutton.

From 1935 until the early 1940s he was a prolific author of novels and short stories. During this time he also was a radio personality and the writer for other radio programs.

During World War II Hurley was a Navy officer attached to the Pacific theatre as an expert on the Philippines and Southeast Asia and wrote instruction booklets for the U.S. invading forces together with assault plans. In 1960 his novel The Parthian was released.

The Washington State University received, from Hurley, his research and drafts of the books The Parthian and Missiles of Victory, later retitled Arrows Against Steel (1975) in 1961 and 1962. They are collected in the Vic Hurley Archives. In 1967, 1976, and 1978 he donated his collection of Philippine artifacts and photographs to the Thomas Burke Memorial Washington State Museum at the University of Washington. They are archived in the Vic and Betty Hurley Collection. He gave the Washington State Historical Society in Tacoma, Washington, three items from his collection of World War I military paraphernalia, a typescript of his book The Parthian and copies of his published books. The University of Oregon Libraries' Special Collections and University Archives holds two linear feet of G. Victor Hurley papers: book-length manuscripts including Blades In the Sun, The Coronado Island Adventures, Jungle Patrol, Men in Sun Helmets, and The Three Bachelors; articles and short stories, miscellaneous items, memorabilia, and correspondence.

== Personal life and death ==
Hurley was married to Dorothea Louise Reynolds^{(nee)} from 1922 to 1925, and they had one son, Gerald Victor Hurley Jr. He died at his home at Panorama City in June 1978.

== Pseudonym confusion ==
Hurley's writings, especially Jungle Patrol, bear similarities to the 1939 film The Real Glory. The film, however, credits author Charles L. Clifford. Other works by Clifford, in common with those of Hurley, are centered on the experiences of American soldiers in the Philippines in the first half of the twentieth century. The similarities of these works, and the possible connection of Hurley to the film, falsely led some researchers to conclude Clifford was a pen name for Hurley, when in fact these are two entirely distinct authors. However, IMDB lists Clifford as the pseudonym for Hurley.

== Books ==
- Southeast of Zamboanga (1935)
- Men in Sun Helmets (1936)
- Swish of the Kris (1938)
- Jungle Patrol (1938)
- The Parthian (1960)
- Arrows Against Steel (1976)
