= Juramentado =

Philippine Martyr Warriors

Juramentado, in Philippine history, refers to a male Moro swordsman (from the Tausug people of the Sulu Archipelago) who attacked and killed occupying and invading police and soldiers, expecting to be killed himself. This was undertaken as a form of jihad or martyrdom. Unlike an amok, who commits acts of random violence against Muslims and non-Muslims alike, a juramentado was a dedicated, premeditated, and sometimes highly skilled warrior who prepared himself through a ritual of binding, shaving, and prayer in order to accomplish brazen attacks armed only with edged weapons.

For generations warlike Moro tribes had successfully prevented Spain from fully controlling the areas around Mindanao and the Sulu Archipelago, developing reputations as notorious seafaring raiders, naval tacticians, and warriors who frequently demonstrated bravery in combat. While Moro forces often didn't match opponents' firepower or armor, such bands used intelligence, audacity and mobility to raid strongly defended targets and quickly defeat more vulnerable ones. One extreme asymmetric warfare tactic was the Moro juramentado.

== Etymology and usage ==
Juramentado is an archaic term derived from the Spanish word juramentar, meaning one who takes an oath. Some sources link amoks (from the Malayan term for "out of control") and juramentados as similar culture-specific syndromes while others draw distinctions of religious preparation and state of mind. A Moro might be said to have "gone juramentado" or be "running juramentado."

U.S. Army officers who had served in Moroland incorporated the idiom into their own vocabulary, but often simply equated it with the Moro people as a whole. In his memoirs, Army Air Service advocate Benjamin D. Foulois said of volatile rival Army Air Service officer Billy Mitchell, "He had become fanatic much in the way that the Moros were in the Philippines. He had become a juramentado and was ready to run amok".

== History ==
The term juramentado was coined by José Malcampo, in command during the Spanish occupation of Jolo Island in 1876, but Moros had been making such personal attacks for many years. By the time of the Spanish–American War juramentados were being discussed in the American media, some official sources finding few documented cases. By 1903, local United States Army commander Leonard Wood sent a report to Governor of the Philippines William Howard Taft indicating juramentados were "an oft repeated offense." Almost forty years later, on the eve of the Japanese invasion of the Philippine Islands beginning the Second World War, Time Magazine was reporting juramentado attacks in Jolo occurring "once every other day".

The Moro juramentados performed suicide attacks against Japanese troops. The Japanese were among several enemies the Moros juramentados launched suicide attacks against, the others being the Spanish, Americans and Filipinos.

The reason for the less usable .38 Long Colt being phased out and replaced by the .45 Colt as well as the very invention of the words for the concept "stopping power" were due to Moro juramentados. Regardless, it is known from contemporary accounts that the .45 and the 00 buckshot shotgun shell were things the soldiers considered essential to the confidence that they could stop a charging, determined Moro. It is also from the impact of the juramentado that Gen. John J. Pershing acquired his respect for the shotgun as a military implement, which Americans would be the only force to carry in numbers into the First World War.

The juramentado suicide charges were started by the Moros in the late 19th century to compensate after 1876 when they suffered reprisals from modern gunboats run by steam used by the Spanish.

The Tausug had a saying, “Marayaw pa muti in bukug ayaw in tikud-tikud” (It is preferable to see the whiteness of your bone due to wounds than whiten your heel from running away) and in magsabil “when one runs amuck and he is able to kill a nonbeliever and in turn gets killed for it, his place in heaven is assured,”

The Tausug waged parang sabil (holy war) for their land (Lupah Sug) and religion against the United States after Bud Bagsak and Bud Dahu and during the Moro National Liberation Front's struggle against the Philippines since 1972, with them being memorialized in tales of Parang Sabil like "The Story of War in Zamboanga" (Kissa sin Pagbunu ha Zambonga about MNLF commander Ustadz Habier Malik's 2013 attack in Zamboanga.

Some Tausug who went on parang sabil did it to redeem themselves in causes of dishonor (hiya). Tausug believe the sabils gain divine protection and can be immune to bullets while going on their suicide attacks. Tausug committed parrangsabil in 1984 at Pata island, 1974 at Jolo, 1968 at Corregidor island, 1913 at Bud Bagsak, 1911 at Bud Talipaw, 1911 and 1906 at Bud Dahu. Tausug believe that the rituals they undergo in preparation for magsasabil and parrangsabil will render them invulnerable to bullets, metal and sharp weapons and that Allah will protect them and determine their fate while using their budjak spears, barung and kalis against enemies like the Americans and Spanish.

== Path to paradise ==
Candidates, known as mag-sabil, "who endure the pangs of death", were selected from Muslim youth inspired to martyrdom by the teaching of imams. Parents were consulted before the young men were permitted by the sultan to undergo training and preparation for Parang-sabil (the path to Paradise). After an oath taken, hand on the Qur'an, the chosen took a ritual bath, all body hair was shaved, and the eyebrows trimmed to resemble "a moon two days old." A strong band was wrapped firmly around the waist, and cords wrapped tightly around the genitals, ankles, knees, upper thighs, wrists, elbows, and shoulders, restricting blood flow and preventing the mag-sabil from losing too much blood from injury before reaching their target. Clad in white robe and turban, the chosen youth would polish and sharpen his weapons before action.

At the moment of attack, the mag-sabil in Tausug would approach a large group of enemies, shout the tahlil, draw kris or barong and then rush into the group swinging his sword, killing and maiming as many victims as possible in the time he had left. The mag-sabil's body would be washed and again wrapped in white for burial. In the unlikely event the mag-sabil survived his attack, it was believed his body would ascend to Paradise after 40 years had passed.

== Response to the threat ==
With the possible exception of Japan's kamikaze pilots in the closing days of World War II, warfare has rarely known a more frightening phenomenon than the juramentados.

— Gowing, Peter G. (July–August 1965). "Kris and Crescent". Saudi Aramco World. Vol. 16, no. 4. pp. 1–11.

The Moros' use of local intelligence to mark target situations, coupled with a keen understanding of the tactical element of surprise made combating juramentado warriors difficult for Spanish troops during its long attempt to occupy the Sulu Archipelago. In an era of warfare where body armor had become anachronistic, an unexpected melee attack with razor-sharp blades was a devastating tactic against veteran soldiers. Even when colonizers had time to draw weapons and fire on the charging attacker, the small caliber weapons commonly in use possessed no stopping power, bullets passing through limbs and torso, the juramentados' ritual binding working as a set of tourniquets to prevent the swordsman from bleeding out from wounds before accomplishing his purpose.

In 1983, the American journalist Daniel P. Mannix released an edited version of the autobiography of his father, Rear Admiral Daniel P Mannix the 3rd. The book, called The Old Navy: The Glorious Heritage of the U.S. Navy, Recounted through the Journals of an American Patriot, included the following paragraph: "What finally stopped the Juramentados was the custom of wrapping the dead man in a pig's skin and stuffing his mouth with pork. As the pig was an unclean animal, this was considered an unspeakable defilement."

Vic Hurley, an American author who was a member of the Philippine Constabulary, wrote the book Jungle Patrol in 1938, arguing that Colonel Alexander Rodgers of the 6th Cavalry Regiment (brother of Thomas S. Rodgers) had implemented the strategy of mass graves and pig entrails:

It was Colonel Alexander Rodgers of the 6th Cavalry who accomplished by taking advantage of religious prejudice what the bayonets and Krags had been unable to accomplish. Rodgers inaugurated a system of burying all dead juramentados in a common grave with the carcasses of slaughtered pigs. The Mohammedan religion forbids contact with pork; and this relatively simple device resulted in the withdrawal of juramentados to sections not containing a Rodgers. Other officers took up the principle, adding new refinements to make it additionally unattractive to the Moros. In some sections the Moro juramentado was beheaded after death and the head sewn inside the carcass of a pig. And so the rite of running juramentado, at least semi-religious in character, ceased to be in Sulu. The last cases of this religious mania occurred in the early decades of the century. The juramentados were replaced by the amucks. .. who were simply homicidal maniacs with no religious significance attaching to their acts.

After the September 11 attacks on the United States, a number of American urban legends began circulating that John J. Pershing had ordered the summary execution of captured enemies using bullets laced with pig blood, and whose bodies were placed in a mass grave filled with pig entrails. Dr. Frank E. Vandiver, professor of history at Texas A&M University and author of Black Jack: The Life and Times of John J. Pershing, said about the burial of juramentados with pig remains that he never found any indication that it was true in extensive research on his Moro experiences, and that such an event would be out of keeping with Pershing's character. Rather, most sources indicate the idea of using pigs was suggested to Pershing but he rejected it.

Yet John Pershing did not say that he had ordered the practice, but that "the army had already adopted" the practice, and that "it was not pleasant", as he states quite clearly in his Memoir:

These juramentado attacks were materially reduced in number by a practice the army had already adopted, one that Muhhamadans held in abhorrence. The bodies were publicly buried in the same grave with a dead pig. It was not pleasant to have to take such measures, but the prospect of going to hell instead of heaven sometimes deterred the would-be assassins.

In the 2013 publishing of his Memoir, a footnote cites a letter from Maj. Gen. J. Franklin Bell to J. Pershing:

Of course there is nothing to be done, but I understand it has long been a custom to bury (insurgents) with pigs when they kill Americans. I think this a good plan, for if anything will discourage the (insurgents) it is the prospect of going to hell instead of to heaven. You can rely on me to stand by you in maintaining this custom. It is the only possible thing we can do to discourage crazy fanatics.

== Similar practices ==
Muslim Acehnese from the Aceh Sultanate performed suicide attacks known as in the Acehnese language Prang sabi against Dutch invaders during the Aceh War. It was considered as part of personal jihad in the Islamic religion of the Acehnese. The Dutch called it Atjèh-moord, (Acehmord, Aceh mord, Aceh-mord) or (Aceh Pungo). Acehnese works of literature called hikayat prang sabi provided the background and reasoning for prang sabi. The Indonesian translations of the Dutch terms are Aceh bodoh (Aceh pungo) or Aceh gila (Aceh mord).

Prang sabi was also used against the Japanese by the Acehnese during the Japanese occupation of Aceh. The Acehnese ulama fought against both the Dutch and the Japanese, revolting against the Dutch in February 1942 and against Japan in November 1942. The revolt was led by the All-Aceh Religious Scholars' Association (PUSA). The Japanese suffered 18 dead in the uprising while they slaughtered up to 100 or over 120 Acehnese. The revolt happened in Bayu and was centred around Tjot Plieng village's religious school. During the revolt, the Japanese troops armed with mortars and machine guns were charged by sword wielding Acehnese under Teungku Abduldjalil (Tengku Abdul Djalil) in Buloh Gampong Teungah and Tjot Plieng on November 10 and 13. In May 1945 the Acehnese rebelled again.

The original jawi alphabet hikayat prang sabi (w:ace:Hikayat Prang Sabi, w:id:Hikayat Prang Sabi) has been transliterated into the Latin alphabet and annotated by Ibrahim Alfian published in Jakarta. Perang sabi was the Acehnese word for jihad, a holy war and Acehnese language literary works on prang sabi were distributed by ulama such as Teungku di Tiro to help the resistance against the Dutch in the Aceh War. The recompense awarded by in paradise detailed in Islamic Arabic texts and Dutch atrocities were expounded on in the hikayat prang sabi which was communally read by small cabals of ulama and Acehnese who swore an oath before going to achieve the desired status of "martyr" by launching suicide attacks on the Dutch. Perang sabil was the Malay equivalent to other terms like Jihad, Ghazawat for "Holy war", the text was also spelled "Hikayat perang sabi". Fiction novels like Sayf Muhammad Isa's Sabil: Prahara di Bumi Rencong on the war by Aceh against the Dutch include references to hikayat prang sabi. Mualimbunsu Syam Muhammad wrote the work called "Motives for Perang Sabil in Nusantara", Motivasi perang sabil di Nusantara: kajian kitab Ramalan Joyoboyo, Dalailul-Khairat, dan Hikayat Perang Sabil on Indonesia's history of Islamic holy war (Jihad). Children and women were inspired to do suicide attacks by the Hikayat Perang Sabil against the Dutch. Hikayat prang sabi is considered as part of 19th century Acehnese literature.

In Dutch-occupied Aceh, hikayat prang sabi was confiscated from Sabi's house during a police raid on September 27, 1917.

== See also ==
- Maharlika
- Timawa
- Pintados
- Puputan
- Filipino martial arts
- Bolo knife
- Banzai charge
- Suicide by cop
