= 2020 Jolo bombings =

Bombings that occurred on August 24, 2020 in Jolo, Philippines

- Part of the Moro conflict
- Location of Jolo in the Philippines
- Location: 06°03′12″N 121°00′03″E; Jolo, Sulu, Philippines
- Date: August 24, 2020; 11:54–12:57 PhST (UTC+08:00)
- Attack type: Bombing; Suicide bombing
- Weapon: Bomb
- Deaths: 15 (including one perpetrator)
- Injuries: 80
- Perpetrator: Abu Sayyaf (also known as Islamic State – East Asia Province)

The 2020 Jolo bombings occurred on August 24, 2020, when insurgents alleged to be jihadists from the Abu Sayyaf group detonated two bombs in Jolo, Sulu, Philippines, killing 14 people and wounding 75 others. The first occurred as Philippine Army personnel were assisting in carrying out COVID-19 humanitarian efforts. The second, a suicide bombing, was carried out near the Our Lady of Mount Carmel Cathedral.

== Background ==
For over three decades, the Abu Sayyaf has been launching terrorist attacks in support of making the province of Sulu independent from the Philippines, as part of the Moro conflict. Sulu is primarily Muslim, whereas the Philippines as a whole is primarily Christian. In 2004, the Abu Sayyaf launched the worst terrorist attack in Filipino history, bombing a ferry which killed 116 people. In 2016, they pledged allegiance to the Islamic State. They are known for using improvised explosive devices and for kidnapping foreigners for ransom, especially within Sulu province.

In August 2020, some days prior to the bombing, the Philippine government arrested a number of militants belonging to the Abu Sayyaf organization. Security forces on Sulu were on high alert due to fears of retribution.

== Attacks ==
On August 24, 2020, at 11:54 am, a motorcycle bomb placed next to a military truck detonated outside the Paradise Food Plaza in downtown Jolo, Sulu. The explosion killed six soldiers, six civilians and a police officer, as well as injuring 69 others. The police and military responded to the scene. An hour later, at 12:57 pm, a female suicide bomber approached the cordoned-off area and attempted to enter. Upon being stopped by a soldier, she detonated the bomb she carried, killing herself and the soldier who stopped her, while wounding six police officers. The second blast occurred approximately 100 meters (110 yd) away from the first blast, in front of a branch of the Development Bank of the Philippines. In total, seven soldiers, one police officer, and six civilians were killed; and 21 soldiers, six police officers, and 48 civilians were wounded. The site of the bombing was close to the site of the 2019 Jolo Cathedral bombings.

== Aftermath ==
The following day, the Islamic State – East Asia Province (also known as Abu Sayyaf) claimed responsibility for the attack. The government believes that Abu Sayyaf bombmaker Mundi Sawadjaan created the bombs and armed the attackers. The entire province of Sulu was placed on lockdown following the blasts.

On August 29, 2020, in Patikul, soldiers searching for the perpetrators of the bombings were attacked by fellow Abu Sayyaf militants. The gunfight resulted in the death of a Filipino soldier and the wounding of seven others; two Abu Sayyaf militants also died in the fight.

=== June shootings ===
On June 29, nearly two months before the bombings, four Army intelligence personnel, by-then investigating the possible presence of two female suicide bombers in Sulu, were killed by Jolo police officers in a shooting incident, with policemen attempted to plant evidence to cover-up the incident. As the bombing happened in the midst of the investigation of the shooting, the military stated the incident have disrupted the intelligence operations that might have averted the bombings, and raised a possible motive that the police officers are connected with the suicide bombers.

== Reactions ==
Immediately after the attacks, presidential spokesperson Harry Roque condemned the bombings saying "authorities are now conducting an investigation, which includes identifying individuals or groups behind these dastardly attacks." Cabinet Secretary Karlo Nograles condemned the attacks in "the strongest possible terms" and said that terrorism has "no place in a civilized world". He also stated that he will bring justice to those behind the "inhuman attack". According to Dr. Rommel C. Banlaoi, a counter-terrorism expert and the Chairman of the Philippine Institute for Peace, Violence and Terrorism Research, the 2020 Jolo bombings were strong indications that suicide terrorism had become the new face of terror in the Philippines. Even prior to the 2020 Jolo bombings, Banlaoi has already explained, "The rise of suicide terrorism in the Philippines arises from the contagious effect of the ideology of violent extremism propagated by ISIS foreign terrorist fighters in the country. ISIS foreign terrorist fighters capitalize on local grievances, historical animosities, and feeling of injustices to propagate violent extremism in the Philippines, particularly in conflict-affected areas of Mindanao. Violent extremism is the ideology that justifies acts of terrorism in the Philippines."

== See also ==
- Civil conflict in the Philippines
- War against the Islamic State
- June–July 2016 Sulu and Basilan clashes
- List of Islamist terrorist attacks
- List of terrorist incidents in 2020
- List of terrorist incidents linked to ISIL
- List of wars and battles involving ISIL
- Terrorism in the Philippines
- War on terror
