= 2019 Jolo Cathedral bombings =

2019 bombing of Jolo Cathedral in Sulu, Philippines

- Part of the Moro conflict
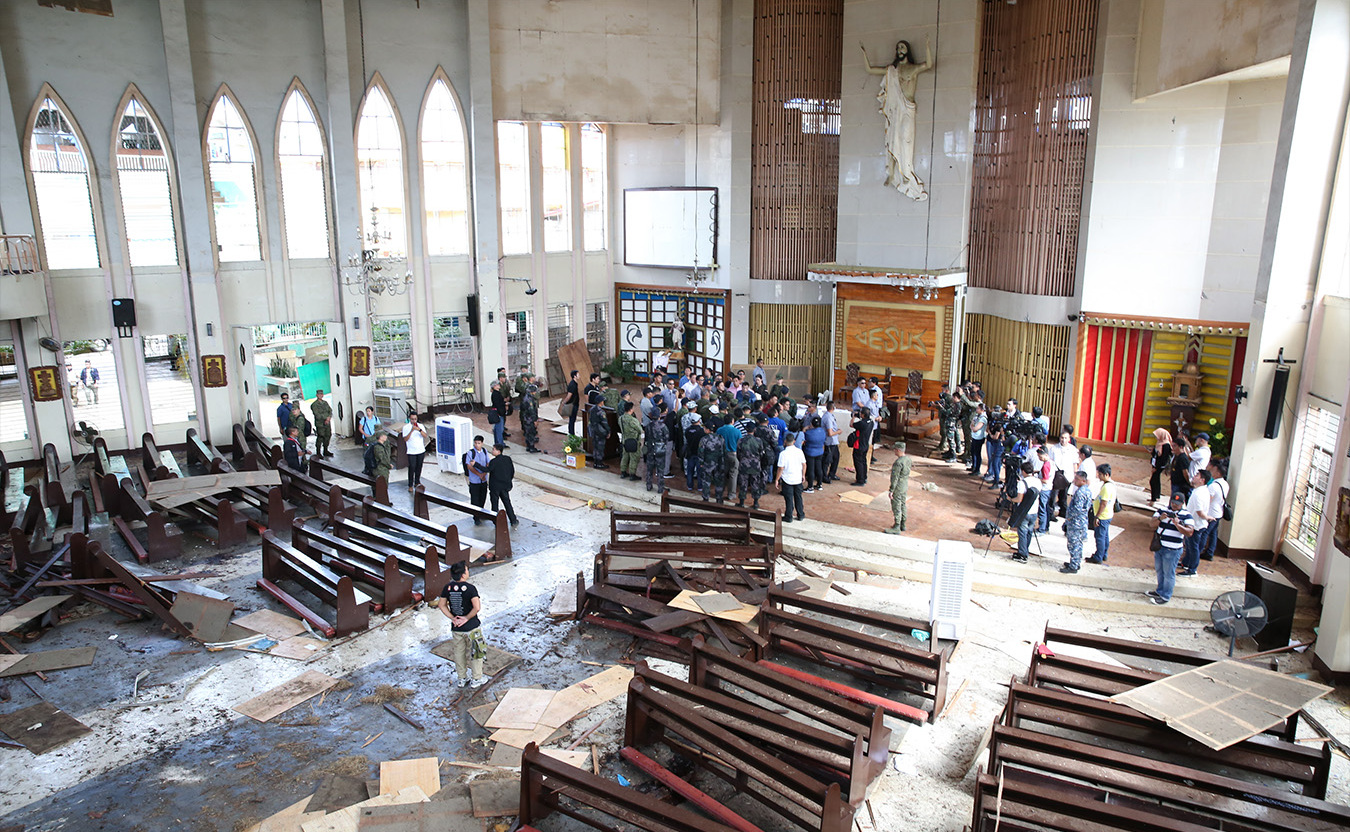
- Aftermath of the bombings

- Location of Jolo Cathedral The site of the bombings
- Location: 6.0526°N 121.0009°E; Jolo, Sulu
- Date: January 27, 2019; 08:28 (UTC+08:00)
- Target: Jolo Cathedral
- Attack type: Explosion, mass murder, suicide bombing, terrorism
- Weapon: Ammonium nitrate pipe bombs
- Deaths: 22 (14 civilians, 5 soldiers, 2 bombers and 1 coast-guardsman)
- Injuries: 102
- Victims: Christians, security forces
- Perpetrators: (Islamic State) Jamaah Ansharut Daulah (Islamic State) Abu Sayyaf (Ajang-Ajang faction)
- Assailants: Rullie Rian Zeke and Ulfah Handayani Saleh
- No. of participants: 6
- Motive: Islamic extremism

In the morning of January 27, 2019, two bombs exploded at the Roman Catholic Cathedral of Our Lady of Mount Carmel in Jolo, Sulu, Philippines. Twenty people were killed and 102 others injured. The bombings took place a week after the autonomy plebiscite held on January 21 for the creation of Bangsamoro. It is believed that the Abu Sayyaf militant group carried out the attacks, and the Islamic State claimed responsibility. President Rodrigo Duterte responded by issuing an "all-out war" directive against the Abu Sayyaf. The bombings were widely condemned by other countries and organizations.

== Background ==
The bombings took place a week after the first part of an autonomous plebiscite held on January 21 to create the Bangsamoro Autonomous Region (BAR). This region was to include all of Sulu Province, including the capital city of Jolo. Jolo is known to be a stronghold of the Abu Sayyaf group (ASG), an affiliate of the Islamic State terror organization, comprising activists from various clans or family-based factions operating under different commanders in the Sulu Archipelago: the group lacks a central command. Sulu was the only province to vote against the Plebiscite, by a margin of 163,526 (54.3%) to 137,630 (45.7%). Despite the results, Sulu Province would still be included in the BAR due to the high majority from other areas.

The proposed Bangsamoro government planned to conduct crackdowns on firearms and local private armies and decommission their weapons once the new autonomous region is established. The Philippine National Police (PNP) believed the attacks were carried out by ASG members in revenge for the deaths of their relatives during the Armed Forces of the Philippines (AFP) military operations against the group. Speaker of the House of Representatives of the Philippines, Gloria Macapagal Arroyo, said poverty was also a contributing factor to the bombings as part of the long-time violence in the Mindanao region.

The Abu Sayyaf Group, or ASG, are known active kidnappers targeting foreigners in the waters of Sulu and Celebes Sea. Abdullah Sandakan, a former Jemaah Islamiyah (JI) militant based in the eastern Malaysian state of Sabah in Borneo island, named the ASG as "using ransom money that had earlier been paid to the ASG for the release of an Indonesian hostage in their recent kidnapping as a fund for the bombings plot". Citing an unnamed Mindanao-based source, it was alleged a "huge sum" was paid by the Malaysian owner of the captive's fishing boat to secure the safe release of two Indonesian fishing boat workers that had been held hostage by the ASG (one had escaped his captors) abducted off Gaya Island off Semporna. Abdullah further alleged part of the ransom money was used by the ASG to pay villagers to shelter the bombing perpetrators.

== Attacks ==
The Armed Forces of the Philippines’ Western Mindanao Command (AFP WestMinCom) released closed-circuit television (CCTV) footage of the bombing with the following timeline:

Timeline of the bombings (January 27):

- 8:26 – People are shown going about Sunday errands.
- 8:28 – First improvised explosive device (IED) exploded inside the cathedral.
- 8:30 – From a different angle, people are seen walking towards the cathedral and running away as a second explosion rips through the Cathedral's parking area as troops from the 35th Infantry Battalion responded.
All times are UTC (UTC+8).

WestMinCom stated that the second IED was placed inside the utility box of a motorcycle parked outside the cathedral. Wounded individuals were immediately brought to the Integrated Provincial Health Office and Sulu Sanitarium for medical treatment.

According to the Department of the Interior and Local Government (DILG), the perpetrators used a strategy similar to the 2002 Bali bombings to inflict additional casualties among first responders. The explosive devices were estimated to weigh not less than two kilograms; with a mobile phone suspected to have been used as a triggering device (recovered near the site). Based on a post-explosion investigation as confirmed by DILG, the explosive devices used were ammonium nitrate pipe bombs.

=== Perpetrators and suspects' identities ===
The Islamic State (IS) took responsibility for the bombings, which they said were committed by "two knights of martyrdom" against a "crusader temple". Philippine military and peace advocates blamed the ASG's Ajang-Ajang faction, citing evidence from military intelligence operatives stating that they had intercepted ASG plans to bomb other parts of downtown Jolo months before. Kamah, a brother of a slain ASG leader, has been tagged as the prime suspect in the bombings. A sub-leader of the ASG named Hatib Hajan Sawadjaan has been named another prime suspect in connection with the bombings plot as their faction too has connections to IS.

On February 1, Philippine Interior Secretary Eduardo Año stated that two Indonesian suicide bombers were involved in the attacks, and were aided by local Abu Sayyaf who acted as guides. The bombers were mistaken for Malaysians; one of them, identified by nom de guerre as Abu Huda, had been living in Sulu province for some time. The second bomber was alleged to be Abu Huda's wife, who had arrived in the province a few days prior to the bombings. The woman is believed to have been the first bomber inside the cathedral, while her husband carried out the second blast at the entrance. PNP chief Oscar Albayalde explained that the Indonesian bombers sailed Southwest to Jolo from Lampinigan Island (Basilan Province) on January 24 and stayed there for a few days. However, it could not be ascertained whether the two went to the island straight from Indonesia or had been around Mindanao island far longer.

On February 4, the main suspect Kamah together with his four accomplices finally surrendered to the authorities following heavy military operations. The four other accomplices were identified as: Albaji Kisae Gadjali (alias "Awag"), Rajan Bakil Gadjali (alias "Radjan"), Kaisar Bakil Gadjali (alias "Isal") and Salit Alih (alias "Papong"). The PNP have filed murder charges on 5 of the suspects and 14 other suspects who remain at large (as of November 2019).

The Philippine Interior Secretary. considers the suspect identification process as complete with the arrest of the five suspects and three others including the two dead bombers, although several others remain at large. The prime suspect Kamah denies all charges and any involvement in the bombings. The prosecution holds that eyewitness accounts form an adequate basis for indictment for Kamah and the other defendants.

In July 2019, the Indonesian National Police (POLRI) confirmed Indonesian citizens involvement in the bombing. POLRI announced the couple identified as Rullie Rian Zeke (RRZ) and Ulfah Handayani Saleh (UHS) from Makassar, South Sulawesi. The announcement came after the POLRI arrested and interrogated two suspected militants affiliated to Jamaah Ansharut Daulah (JAD)- a group in Indonesia with links to ISIL- who confirmed the deceased couple RRZ and UHS were also JAD members. In May 2019, intelligence by Malaysian Special Branch uncovered RRZ and UHS were earlier helped by two Indonesian militants with links to ISIL working as labourers in Keningau District of Sabah in Malaysia with intentions to travel to the southern Philippines via confession of two suspects arrested by Royal Malaysian Police early in May. A subsequent POLRI arrest and thorough investigation of another group of Indonesian militants in Padang of West Sumatra in June 2019, confirmed the identity of RRZ and UHS.

Through deoxyribonucleic acid (DNA) test by Indonesian police, the deceased couple family were able to be traced as both being Indonesian deportees from Turkey serving under the direction of an East Kalimantan JAD member named Yoga residing in Malaysia and recently arrested by the Royal Malaysian Police in Sabah. Yoga are the current connectors of Islamist terrorists organization between Indonesia, Malaysia and the Philippines replacing Andi Basso who is being actively hunted for his involvement in the 2016 Samarinda church bombing in East Kalimantan. Andi Basso is believed by Indonesian authorities to be currently hiding in the Southern Philippines.

== Investigation and government response ==
=== Further details ===
CCTV footage of the area depicts a person identified as Kamah, wearing a blue-green jacket and holding a mobile phone. Kamah, brother of deceased ASG leader Surakah Ingog, is seen wandering around the cathedral with several other suspects before the explosion. Kamah is a known bomb maker for the ASG, according to investigation reports released by PNP chief Albayalde. The Philippine Army had released the images of four suspects in connection with the attacks as captured by the CCTV footage. The authorities, including the country's president, did not rule out the possibility that the explosion was the work of suicide bombers. Nevertheless, based on statements to the military by two surviving victims, eyewitnesses saw a woman hiding a bomb inside her bag and left it in one of the pews inside the cathedral where the explosion happened afterwards. Both witnesses, however, could not fully describe the woman's physical features.

On January 30, two of the suspects that were earlier identified through the CCTV footage surrendered to police to clear their names; one of them was the suspect identified as the brother of deceased ASG leader. Another two followed suit, fearing the authorities would hunt them down, despite neither being identified by WestMinCom in the video that had been released. These four have been cleared and released although their claims of innocence will still require verification from the PNP, who admit they misidentified one man as Kamah. The PNP also admitted there were security lapses at the Cathedral despite previous threats for the past five years. Several other witnesses recalled seeing a woman who they suspected of bringing a bomb, but the claims are deemed "not conclusive" as based on the initial findings of the local PNP Explosive and Ordnance Division (EOD) lab. The EOD laboratory found the bomb did not touch ground when it exploded.

Through the investigation on the Indonesian bombers arrival background, the PNP stated the couple boarded a tricycle to Caltex Tiam at 19:00 on the evening after their arrival in Jolo. At 19:30, they were supposedly met by suspects identified as Papong, Awag and Radjan and boarded Awag's jeepney. The group then reached Usaw in Barangay Langhub to meet with several other suspects named Kamah, Barak, Makrim and Usman who joined them to Sitio Bastiong. In a forested area, the group is alleged to have planned the bombings together with ASG leader Sawadjaan. The Indonesian couple were sent by the ASG on January 26 to carry black trolley bags. They were escorted by Usman, Barak and nine other armed men to Barangay Latihto at 17:10. Despite the claim by Philippine authorities for the involvement of Indonesian citizens in the bombings, an investigation team sent by Indonesia to the Philippines to investigate were at that time unable to confirm that an Indonesian couple were behind the attack. The Indonesian Embassy in Manila said they remained unclear on the veracity of Philippine Interior Secretary Año's statement on their nationals involvement in the attack as DNA and the CCTV evidence had yet to be released to Indonesian authorities for verification. Philippine National Intelligence Coordinating Agency (NICA) also did not see the basis of Minister Año's statement. On February 20, the Philippine National Police Crime Laboratory test results showed that four leg bone specimens of two unidentified persons among the bombing victims belonging to a male and female, which bolstered the probable involvement of said couple as corroborated by eyewitness accounts.

=== Authority's response and security force mobilization ===
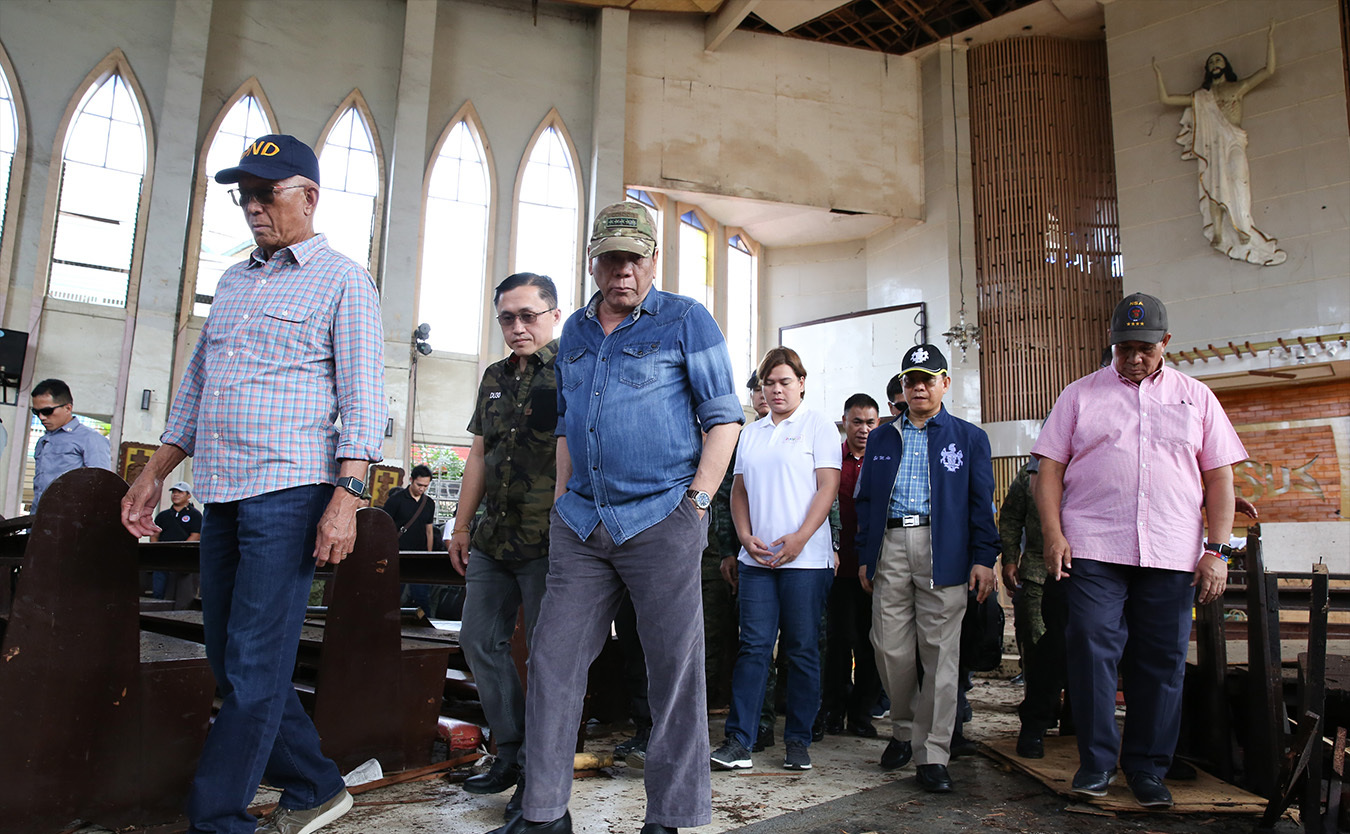
President Rodrigo Duterte and other government officials inspect the cathedral in the aftermath of the bombings.

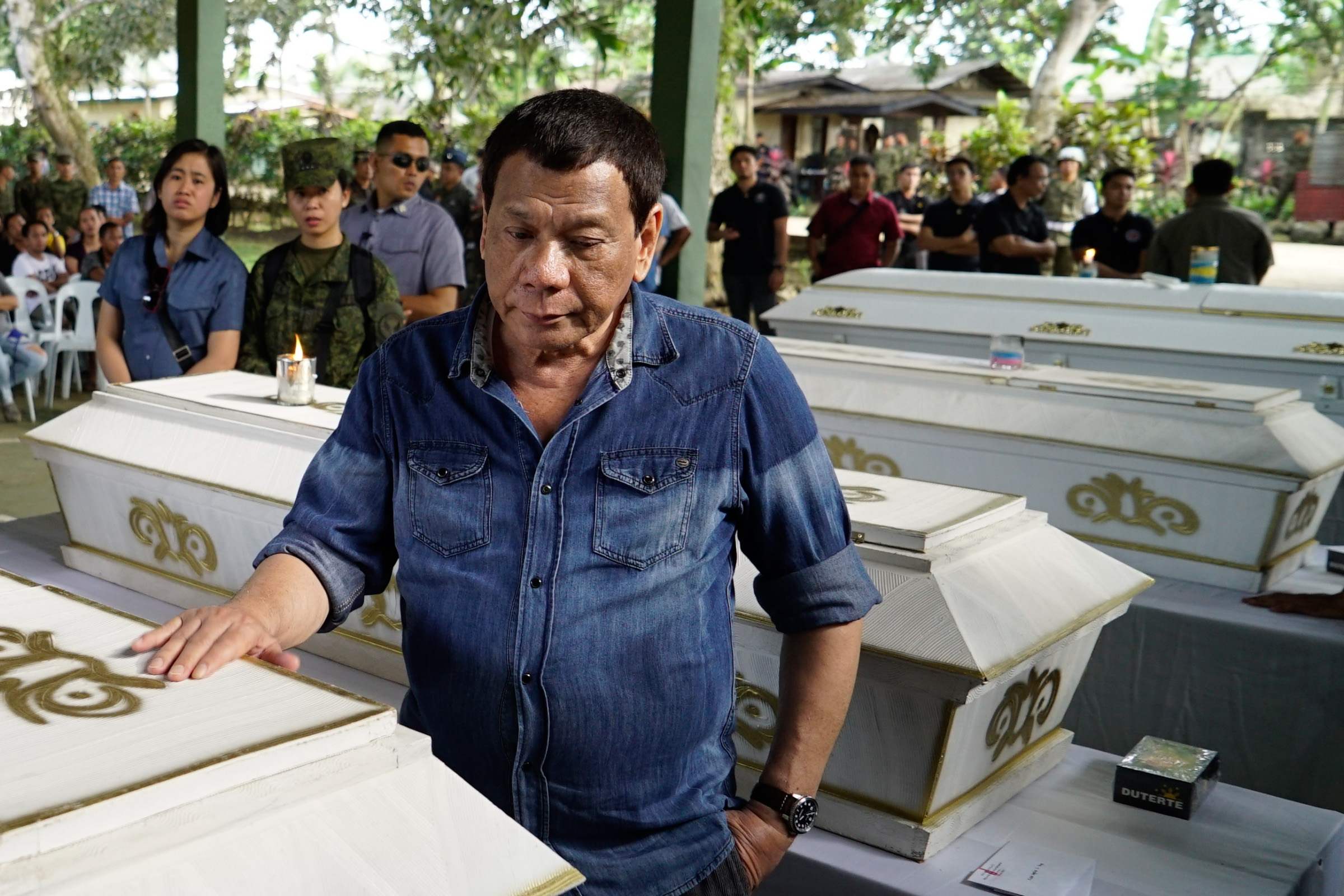
President Duterte pays his last respects to the victims of the bombings.

Shortly after the incident, Malacañang Palace issued a statement that no mercy will be given to the perpetrators. Presidential spokesperson Salvador Panelo stressed that "We will pursue to the ends of the earth the ruthless perpetrators behind this dastardly crime until every killer is brought to justice and put behind bars. The law will give them no mercy". The Palace also stated the bombings provided "more reason" to retain martial law in the south. President Rodrigo Duterte expressed his outrage over the incidents and visited the site of the bombings the following day. The Commission on Elections stated that, despite the bombings, it did not see the need to place Jolo under its control and defer the upcoming February 6 plebiscite.

The Autonomous Region in Muslim Mindanao (ARMM) condemned the bombings in the "strongest terms" and has provided financial assistance to 36 of the over 100 survivors of the bomb attacks, with each victim receiving ₱20,000. Mindanao Development Authority chairman Abul Khayr Alonto also called the incident a "dastardly act of insanity" which "should not be allowed to instil fear in our peace-loving populace".

WestMinCom confirmed that President Duterte had issued an "all-out war directive" order against the terror groups, with Jolo being put on total lockdown. The Bureau of Immigration had also been put on heightened alert to prevent the entry of new foreign terror elements, while the Land Transportation Franchising and Regulatory Board directed all public utility vehicles to implement stricter security; it also advised the public to report any suspicious activity in terminals and vehicles to authorities. During the joint raid conducted by Armed Forces of the Philippines Military and PNP in Barangay Latih of Patikul, Sulu, to arrest Kamah, the suspect managed to escape even as one of his companions was killed.

Among items seized during the raid were a .45 calibre pistol, a sniper scope, two mobile phones and a motorcycle. The military continued hunting for the suspect with attack helicopters deployed in the province, followed by house-to-house searches. Approximately 5,000 elite soldiers have been mobilized, with the military operations resulting in many families fleeing their homes. The continuing military operations resulted in the arrest and deaths of many ASG-linked militants.

== Other reactions ==
=== Other militant groups ===
Moro Islamic Liberation Front (MILF) chairman Murad Ebrahim said: "The MILF leadership joined peace-loving individuals in strongly condemning the twin bombing of the Cathedral". MILF peace panel chairman Mohagher Iqbal condemned the attacks perpetrated against innocent civilians, calling them: "senseless violence". He was followed by Moro National Liberation Front (MNLF) chairman Yusop Jikiri, who stated that the bombings can: "only be the responsibility of terrorist, anti-peace, uncivilized and misguided persons". The MNLF under Emmanuel Fontanilla called upon the government to conduct peace talks with groups including ASG and the Bangsamoro Islamic Freedom Fighters (BIFF), even if they are terrorists.

=== Religious community ===
The Catholic Bishops' Conference of the Philippines released a statement expressing sympathy for the victims and their families, condemning the attacks as an act of terrorism. The bishops called for Christians to join with Muslims and indigenous communities to advocate for peace against violent extremism.

Pope Francis denounced the bombings, reiterating: "My strongest condemnation for this episode of violence that once again strikes this Christian community. I raise my prayers for the dead and wounded. May the Lord, Prince of Peace, convert the hearts of the violent and give the inhabitants of that region a peaceful coexistence". The World Council of Churches (WCC) expressed profound sorrow and said "In the face of this brutality, the human family, all people of faith and of good will, must stand together to recommit to respecting and caring for one another, to protecting one another, and to preventing such violence". The Roman Catholic Archdiocese of Davao has called on every churchgoer to refrain from bringing backpacks and boxes inside churches and chapels due to the threat of violence prevailing in the region of Mindanao in the wake of the bombings.

Organization of the Imam Council of the Philippines (OICP) also condemned the attack, due to its: "barbaric nature which is forbidden in Islam", adding that such barbaric acts: "not only destroy the living of peace, but demolishes the tranquillity of a sound society". Another Islamic sect, the Ahlul Bait, said: "such a barbarous act must be condemned in the strongest terms".

=== Non-governmental organizations ===
Local human rights group Karapatan also condemned the attacks but reminded the government that the incidents should not be used as an excuse to violate human rights further, especially towards government critics. The Makabayan bloc feared that the incident might be used to extend the declaration of martial law to the whole country. Dr. Rommel Banlaoi, Chairman of the non-government think tank, the Philippine Institute for Peace, Violence and Terrorism Research, warns that the Jolo Cathedral bombing will pose as "a big challenge for the Bangsamoro government."

=== International response ===
Various countries issued statements condemning the attacks and offering condolences to the affected victims, (Note: Including: Argentina, Australia, Bahrain, Belarus, Brazil, Brunei, Canada, China, Egypt, France, Germany, Hungary, India, Indonesia, Iran, Israel, Japan, Malaysia, Mexico, Norway, Qatar, Russia, Saudi Arabia, Singapore, South Africa, Spain, Thailand, Turkey, the United Kingdom, the United States, and Vietnam.) as well as international organizations including the Asian Development Bank, Association of Southeast Asian Nations, European Union, Organisation of Islamic Cooperation, United Nations, and World Bank. UK's Foreign and Commonwealth Office raised a travel warning for Western and Central Mindanao as well as the Sulu Archipelago following the incidents. The bombings indirectly created negative impacts towards the barter trade between Malaysia and the Philippines with concerns raised from Filipino barter traders over their safety.

Neighbouring Royal Malaysia Police (RMP) stepped up security in their Sabah's state to prevent foreign terror groups transiting through Malaysian East Coast major towns like Sandakan and Tawau prior to proceeding to the Southern Philippine islands. Malaysian Deputy Home Minister Azis Jamman instructed all of Malaysian enforcement agencies: the Police, Malaysian Armed Forces, Civil Defence Department and Eastern Sabah Security Command (ESSCOM) to increase the border security since they did not want the repetition of 1972, where many Southern Filipino refugees fled to Sabah as a result of the civil war, considering the many social problems associated with the refugees still being reported.

The Indonesian Consulate in Sabah issued a statement of "no knowledge" of any ransom paid by any parties for the release of any citizens from ASG abductors in recent kidnappings, in response to claims made by former JI member that ransom money was used in part of the bombings, adding that the Government of Indonesia did not even communicate nor negotiate with the kidnappers for their release. Earlier on January 16, the Director of the Indonesian Citizens Protection of the Ministry of Foreign Affairs of Indonesia Muhammad Iqbal also rejected any claim about the use of ransom money, saying the hostages were released through the collaboration of an "inside network" between their government and Indonesian "assets" in the southern Philippines.

Indonesian Foreign Minister Ms. Retno Marsudi condemned the bombing and sent condolences, and clarified their stance that the Indonesian embassy in Manila and their Consulate General in Davao were still attempting to get definitive information from various parties consequent to Minister Año's claim of Indonesian citizens' involvement. Director of National Agency for Combating Terrorism (BNPT) Irfan Idris stated as of February 3, 2019, formal verifications of Indonesian involvement had not been received by Indonesian Head of Police Public Information Section Senior Commander Syahar Diantono nor by Co-ordinating Minister of Interior Minister Wiranto. Indonesian anti-terrorism Detachment 88 team with Indonesian State Intelligence Agency (BIN), BNPT and representatives of the Indonesian Foreign Affairs Ministry had also been flown to Jolo to assist in the identification of the suicide bombers.

On January 30, Hungary offered Ft 30 million (₱1.89 million) as emergency assistance to the victims of the bombings through the Hungary Helps Program. China via its Manila Embassy pledged a total of RMB5 million (₱38.8 million) for those affected in the bombings. China, India, Russia and the United States have also expressed their commitment to help the Philippines in their fight against terrorism in their country.

== Related incidents ==
A few days after the cathedral bombings, following a televised statement by President Duterte that "the attacks may have involved a suicide bomber", a grenade was thrown into a mosque in the village of Barangay Talon-Talon, southeast of Zamboanga City. This resulted in the death of two civilians and the wounding of three others. Beng Climaco, the mayor of Zamboanga City, ordered the military and police authorities to conduct a thorough investigation on the incident, which they feared was "a consequence of a tension between Muslims and Christians" resulting from the Jolo Cathedral bombings.

== See also ==
- 2020 Jolo bombings
