= 2010 Times Square car bombing attempt =

Attempted terrorist attack in New York City

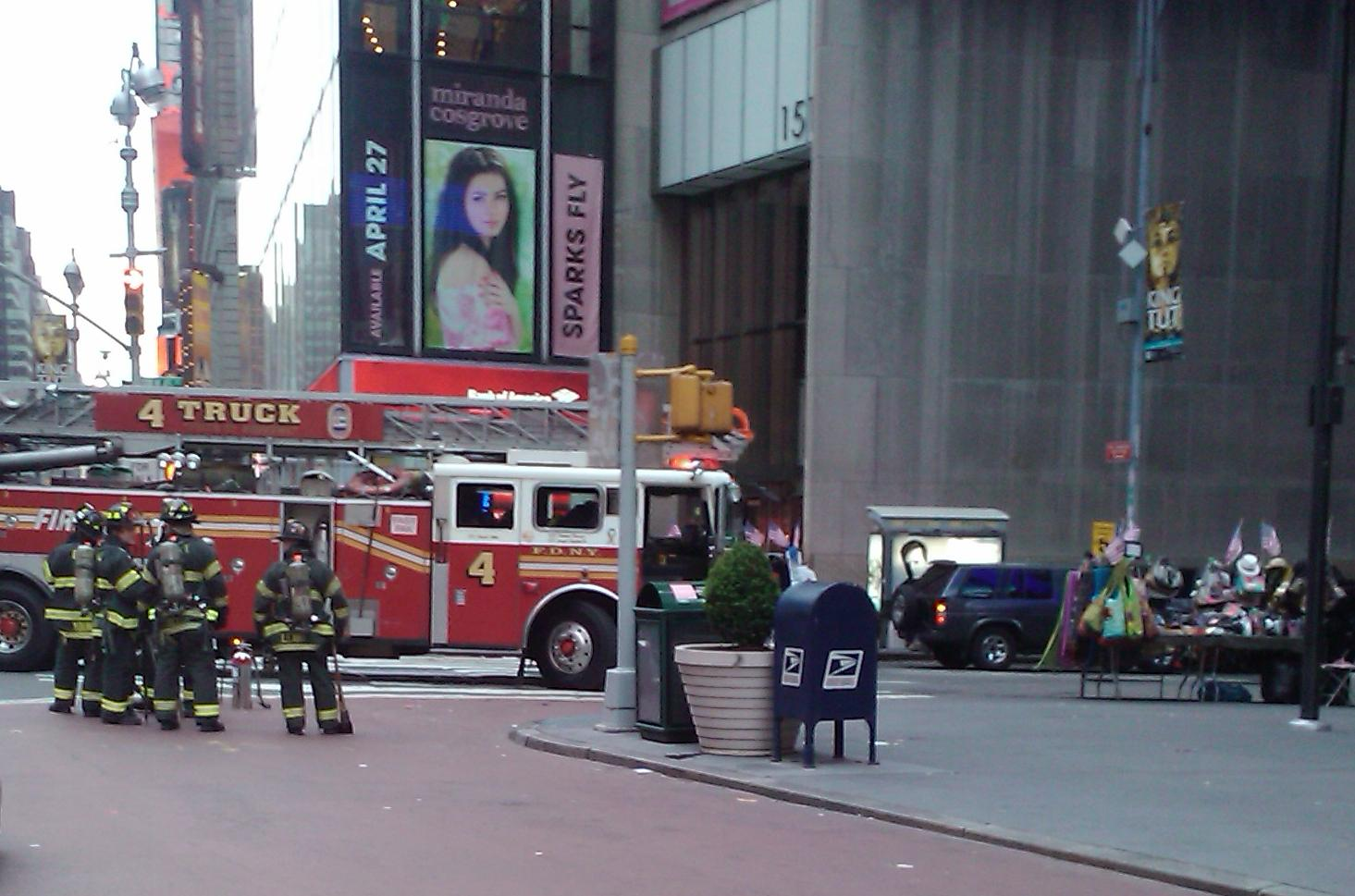
- Firefighters on scene with the dark blue Nissan Pathfinder SUV (right) in Times Square, Manhattan, 27 minutes after the attempted attack.
- Location: 40.758056°N 73.985768°W; 1 Astor Plaza/1515 Broadway, New York City (Times Square, Manhattan) 10036, United States
- Date: Saturday, May 1, 2010; 6:28 p.m. EDT (UTC−04:00)
- Attack type: Car bombing (failed attempt); Terrorism
- Deaths: 0
- Injuries: 0
- Perpetrators: Tehrik-i-Taliban Pakistan (Financing and training); Faisal Shahzad (perpetrator)
- Motive: See below
- Convicted: Faisal Shahzad

On May 1, 2010, a terrorist attack was attempted in Times Square in Manhattan, New York, United States. Two street vendors alerted NYPD officers after they spotted smoke coming from a vehicle, and a car bomb was discovered. The bomb had been ignited, but failed to explode, and was disarmed before it caused any casualties. Two days later, federal agents arrested Faisal Shahzad, a 30-year-old Pakistan-born resident of Bridgeport, Connecticut, who had become a U.S. citizen in April 2009. He was arrested after he had boarded Emirates Flight 202 to Dubai at John F. Kennedy International Airport. He admitted attempting the car bombing and said that he had trained at a Taliban-run terrorist training camp in Pakistan, according to U.S. officials.

United States Attorney General Eric Holder said that Shahzad's intent had been "to kill Americans." Shahzad was charged in federal court in Manhattan on May 4 with attempted use of a weapon of mass destruction and other federal crimes related to explosives. More than a dozen people were arrested by Pakistani officials in connection with the plot. Holder said the Pakistani Taliban directed the attack and may have financed it. U.S. Secretary of State Hillary Clinton warned of "severe consequences" if an attack like this were to be successful and traced back to Pakistan. The Obama administration saw a need for retaliatory options, including a unilateral military strike in Pakistan, if a future successful attack was to be traced to Pakistan-based militants.

On October 5, 2010, Shahzad was sentenced to life in prison without the possibility of parole after pleading guilty to a 10-count indictment in June, including charges of conspiracy to use a weapon of mass destruction and attempting an act of terrorism.

== Car bombing attempt ==
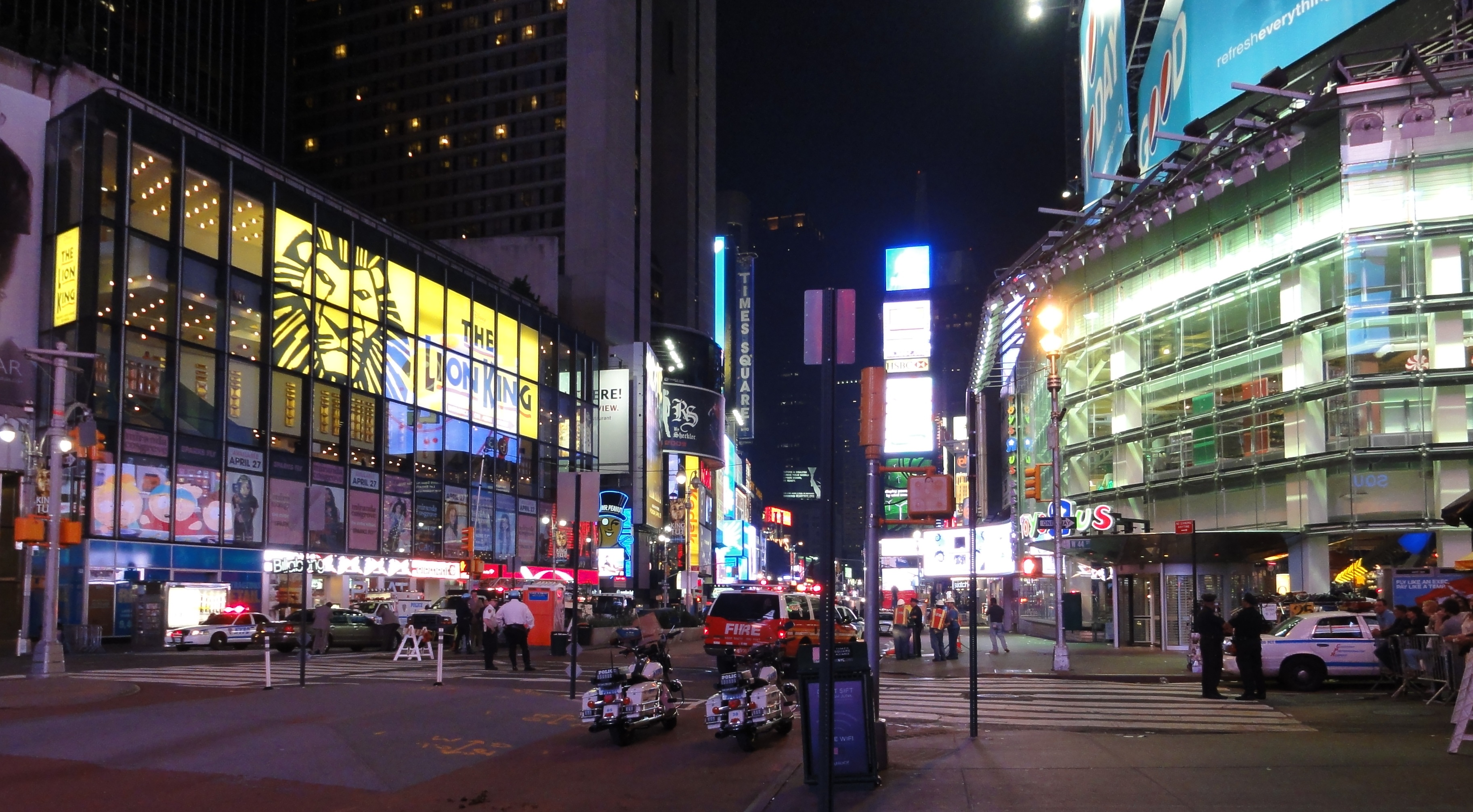
Times Square after the vehicle fire was extinguished

Surveillance video shows the bomber's vehicle, a dark blue 1993 Nissan Pathfinder sport utility vehicle with tinted windows, entering Times Square at approximately 6:28 p.m. Eastern Daylight Time on Saturday evening, May 1, 2010. The vehicle was left, unoccupied, on a tourist-crowded block at the eastern corner of 1 Astor Plaza near the entrance to the Minskoff Theatre which was housing the musical The Lion King. Surveillance video footage shows the driver walking away through an alley shortly after parking the vehicle.

The vehicle's engine was running and its hazard lights were on. Two minutes after the vehicle entered Times Square, several street vendors noticed smoke coming from rear vents of the vehicle and the sound of firecrackers going off inside; the men alerted nearby mounted police. The police officer looked inside and saw smoke and canisters, and smelled gunpowder. He immediately called for backup, a bomb disposal team, and the Fire Department.

The police quickly evacuated and barricaded the area stretching from 43rd Street to 49th Street on Seventh Avenue, and 45th Street from Seventh Avenue to Eighth Avenue, of all vehicle and foot traffic, including Broadway-performance attendees. They also evacuated several buildings near the vehicle, including the New York Marriott Marquis hotel. Although many Broadway shows were delayed, no performances were cancelled.

The vehicle was set ablaze, but did not detonate, apparently due to a malfunction in the ignition source. Upon arrival, the bomb disposal team broke the vehicle's rear window and used a remote-controlled robotic device to search the inside of the vehicle and disassemble it safely.

== Initial investigation ==
=== Early stages ===
Shortly after the bomb was discovered, the police looked for a male who was seen on surveillance footage, changing his shirt in Shubert Alley (which runs between 44th and 45th Streets, just west of Broadway). By May 4, however, he was no longer of interest to the police. Investigators also looked for another person captured on video running north on Broadway, away from the area.

In the early stages of the investigation, officials considered several possibilities as to the identity and motive of the perpetrator. Police Commissioner Raymond Kelly speculated that the attack could be lone-wolf terrorism, saying: "A terrorist act doesn't necessarily have to be conducted by an organization, an individual can do it on their own." Investigators compared similarities between the Times Square device and the two devices discovered outside a London bar in the al-Qaeda 2007 London car bombs.

The police also investigated whether the bomb was planted in relation to threats posted on the Revolution Muslim website against the creators of the controversial animated sitcom South Park. The episodes "200" and "201", originally aired on April 14 and 21, 2010, had offended some with their irreverent depiction of the prophet Muhammad. Ultimately, it was determined that the bomber had trained for months prior to the first broadcast of "200".

E-ZPass and other camera records at toll plazas were reviewed to identify where the Pathfinder entered Manhattan. Law enforcement officials reviewed hours of security camera footage from at least 82 surveillance cameras in the area to attempt to track the suspect's movements before and after the bomb.

=== Explosive device ===
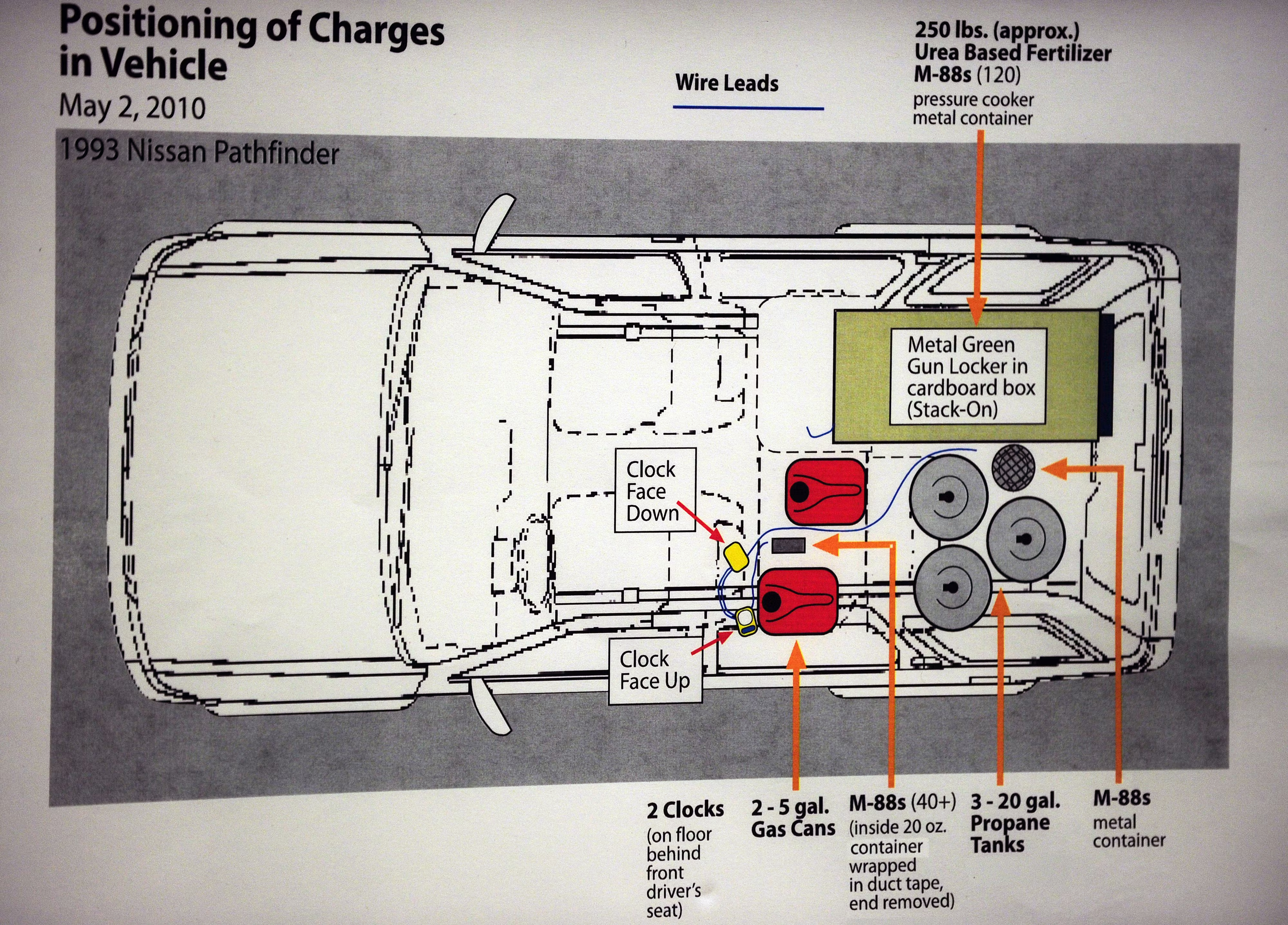
Justice Department diagram showing positioning of charges in vehicle

Investigators released details of the explosive device in a press conference on May 4. The bomb components were placed in the rear of the vehicle, as seen in a U.S. Department of Justice diagram of the device. Commissioner Kelly said the bomb components were all "locally available materials," and investigators began attempting to track down where the materials were purchased.

Two travel alarm clocks with batteries functioned as triggering devices. They were connected by electrical wires to containers of explosive and incendiary materials, including two full 5-gallon cans of gasoline, three full 20-gallon propane tanks, and two separate metal containers with M-88 firecrackers inside. Also on the backseat was a 55-inch (140 cm) x 32-inch (810 mm) green metal gun locker that contained a metal pressure cooker, connected to the alarm clocks; over 100 additional MM-88s; and 8 plastic bags containing a total of 250 pounds (110 kg) of urea-based fertilizer. A total of 152 M-88s were located inside the vehicle.

Investigators described the bomb as "amateurish." Several factors may have led to it failing to detonate: the detonator was not properly attached; the gunpowder content of the MM-88s was minimal; and the urea-based fertilizer was not of a type suitable for bomb-making, unlike the ammonium nitrate-based fertilizer which was used in the Oklahoma City bombing. The president of the fireworks company that produced the fireworks later commented "The M88 he used wouldn't damage a watermelon. Thank goodness he used that". Police said that had the device worked as intended, the bomb would have caused a large fireball and sprayed enough shrapnel to wound or kill numerous pedestrians and cause major property damage.

=== Tracking down the suspect ===
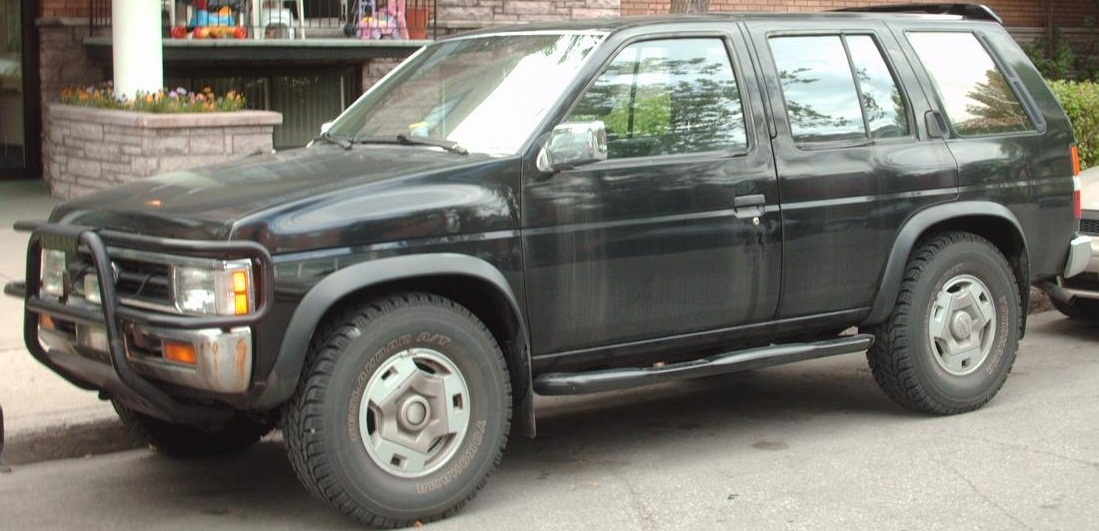
A Nissan Pathfinder of a similar year and color to the one purchased by Shahzad for use in the bombing

Investigators examined the Pathfinder at a forensics center in Jamaica, Queens, for fibers, fingerprints, hair, and DNA evidence. The Pathfinder and bomb components were then taken to the FBI Laboratory in Quantico, Virginia, for further analysis.

The license plates recovered from the Pathfinder had been stolen by Shahzad from a Ford F-150 pickup truck awaiting repair at a Stratford, Connecticut garage. The registered owner of the plates and truck was not involved in the bombing attempt. The owner of the garage stated that plates had been stolen from vehicles in their parking lot previously.

The vehicle identification number (VIN), a unique serial number used to identify individual motor vehicles, had been removed from the car's dashboard and door, but police were able to retrieve the VIN from the bottom of its engine block. The investigators traced the SUV's last registered owner, a female college student who had sold the suspect the Pathfinder. They collected the buyer's e-mail address from an email he sent to the seller.

They also recovered a phone number for the pre-paid disposable cell phone the suspect had used to arrange the sale, and determined that it had been used for calls to and from a Pakistani telephone number which they knew to be associated with a Pakistani-American citizen, Faisal Shahzad. Shahzad quickly became the investigation's main suspect. A review of Shahzad's phone records showed that he had received a series of calls from Pakistan before and after he purchased the Pathfinder. Investigators also examined international phone records of other possible associates.

Several keys were recovered from the Pathfinder, including a key to Shahzad's house in Connecticut and a key to one of his other cars, a black 1998 Isuzu Rodeo. It was later determined that Shahzad had parked the Rodeo several blocks from the bomb site the day before the attack, planning to use it as a getaway car. On the day of the attack, however, he accidentally left the keys to the Isuzu in the Pathfinder and took the train home instead. He returned for the Isuzu the following day, with a second set of keys.

== Perpetrator ==
=== Early life, family, work, and naturalization ===
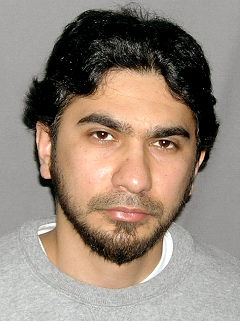
Faisal Shahzad's mugshot

Faisal Shahzad was born in Pakistan in 1979 to a wealthy, well-educated family. His father, a former Pakistan Air Force Vice Marshal, is deputy director general of the Civil Aviation Authority of Pakistan. Shahzad attended primary school in Saudi Arabia, and then studied in Pakistan. Arriving in the U.S. in 1999 on an F-1 student visa, he studied at now-defunct Southeastern University. In 1999 the United States Customs Service placed him on its travel lookout list. He transferred in 2000 to the University of Bridgeport, receiving a B.A. in 2002, and an M.B.A. in 2005. In 2004, in an arranged marriage, he married Huma Asif Mian, a Colorado-born U.S. citizen who had just graduated from the University of Colorado at Boulder.

He worked in the accounting department of Elizabeth Arden in Connecticut from 2002 to 2006, leaving for a junior financial analyst job (for an estimated $55–80,000 salary) for Affinion Group in Connecticut until he resigned in June 2009. He had been granted a three-year H1-B skilled worker visa in 2002, a green card in 2006, and became a U.S. citizen in April 2009 by his marriage to his wife. He also had a Karachi identification card, reflecting Pakistani residency.

Shahzad's family lived in a single-family three-bedroom house in Shelton, Connecticut, from approximately 2006 to 2009. The mortgage was approximately $200,000, and he had also taken out a $65,000 home equity loan on the house. He defaulted on both loans in March 2009, and the bank foreclosed on his home and sued him in September 2009. His wife and children returned to Pakistan following this.

=== West Asian travels ===
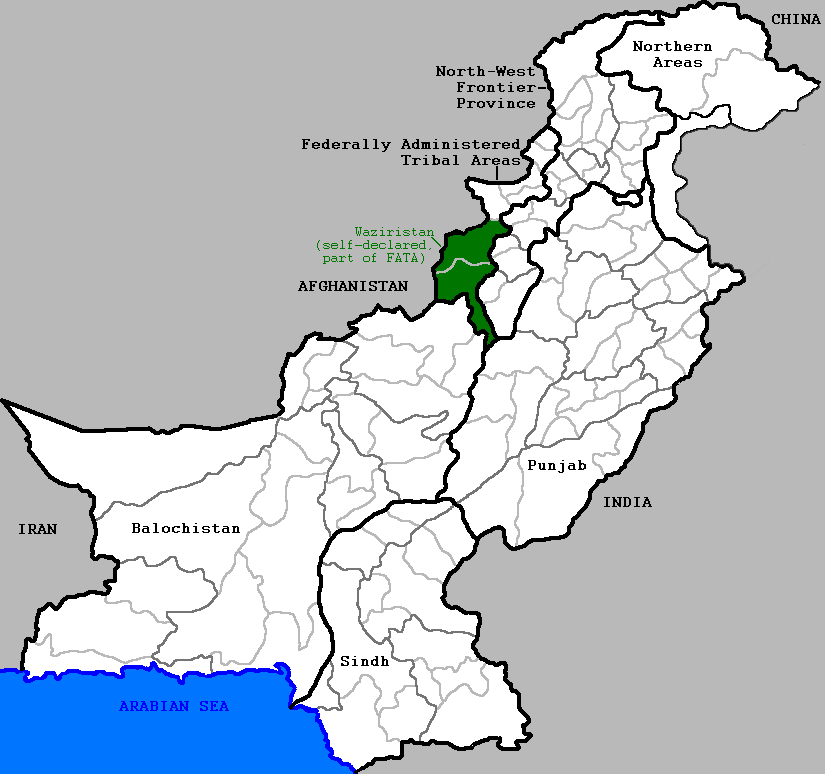
Map of Pakistan and Waziristan

Shahzad regularly travelled to Pakistan, making at least 12 trips to the country since 1999. Between January 1999 and April 2008, Shahzad reportedly brought approximately $82,500 in large increments into the U.S., drawing the attention of the Department of Homeland Security. He had been placed on the Traveler Enforcement Compliance System, a law enforcement database that collected information on travelers suspected of violating federal law.

He told investigators that while in Pakistan, he trained at a terrorist training camp in the mountainous Waziristan region in December 2008 and January 2009; this reportedly included instruction in explosives. Waziristan is located in what was then called the Federally Administered Tribal Areas (FATA), a hotbed of militant activity, and home to a number of terrorist and militant organizations, including al-Qaeda and the Pakistani Taliban.

The New York Times reported that sometime in 2009, he had sought his father's permission join the Taliban insurgency against American and NATO forces in Afghanistan. His father refused, citing Islamic law that forbids a man from deserting his family. He spent much of 2009 in Pakistan, and visited other Middle Eastern countries in the months leading up to the attack. Shahzad traveled to Dubai on June 2, 2009.

On July 3, 2009, he reportedly traveled to Pakistan and is believed to have visited the city of Peshawar, where jihadist groups are known to recruit foreign fighters to join them in the Federally Administered Tribal Areas. He stayed there from July 7 to July 22, allegedly seeking training or assistance with his planned attack. In September 2009, Shahzad travelled to Pakistan, where his wife was living; he stayed there until returning to the U.S. in February 2010. During this lengthy stay, U.S. officials believe he may have spent significant time training with members of the Pakistani Taliban. It was during this period that investigators believe he fully committed to the bombing.

=== Return to the U.S. and planning the attack ===
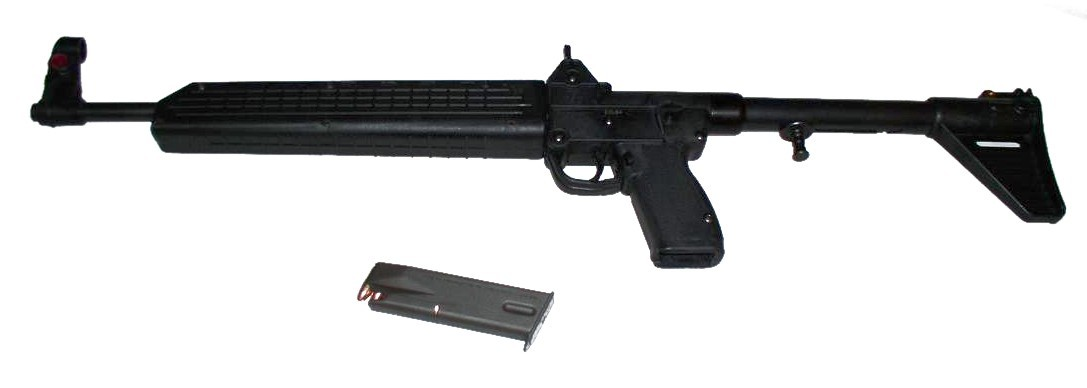
Kel-Tec 9mm SUB-2000, the same type purchased by Shahzad

After dropping his wife and children off in Saudi Arabia, he returned to the U.S. on February 3, 2010, on an Emirates flight from Dubai. U.S. authorities reportedly identified a money courier who helped funnel cash to Shahzad from abroad to finance the car bombing. There is no record of Shahzad having a legitimate job following his return. Despite this, he was able to pay rent for an $1,150-per-month two-bedroom apartment in Bridgeport, Connecticut, and had ready cash to pay for purchases associated with the attack, leading investigators to believe he was receiving outside funding, likely from the Pakistani Taliban. Shortly before the bombing attempt, Shahzad is known to have met with an unnamed person at a Dunkin' Donuts in Ronkonkoma, New York, who provided him with $4,000 cash.

He began to purchase the ingredients for his bomb over an extended period of time to avoid detection; it is believed that this tactic was taught at the training camp in Pakistan. On March 8, he bought Silver Salute M88 fireworks from a store in Matamoras, Pennsylvania; he later made at least one call to the store from his burner phone. That month, he also purchased a new Kel-Tec 9mm SUB-2000 in Connecticut for $400.

On April 24, Shahzad used Craigslist to facilitate the purchase of the 1993 Nissan Pathfinder. After inspecting the interior and cargo area, but not the engine, he paid $1,300 cash for the vehicle in the parking lot of a Connecticut shopping center. He declined the offer of a bill of sale. He later had the windows tinted to reduce outside visibility into the vehicle. He bought a second vehicle through Craigslist, a black Isuzu Rodeo, from a mechanic in Stratford, Connecticut.

Shahzad reportedly watched streaming videos online to determine the day of the week and time that Times Square would be busiest, eventually settling on Saturday night at 6:30 pm. On April 28, three days before the attempted bombing, he drove the Pathfinder from Connecticut to Times Square, apparently in a dry run to figure out where he would park the vehicle during the attack.

== Arrest, questioning, and prosecution ==
=== Arrest and searches ===
On May 3, federal authorities confirmed Shahzad as a person of interest in the attack. At 11:45 pm EDT, U.S. Customs and Border Protection (CBP) officers arrested him at John F. Kennedy International Airport. It had been just over 53 hours since the bombing attempt. He was detained just moments before his flight, Emirates Flight 202 to Dubai, left the gate. His destination was Islamabad, Pakistan, and he had paid for his estimated $800 ticket in cash. After he was arrested, Shahzad directed authorities to his car which he had driven to and parked at the airport, a white Isuzu Trooper. His Kel-Tec 9 mm SUB-2000 was inside it, along with five full magazines of ammunition.

The FBI and NYPD searched Shahzad's apartment in Bridgeport, Connecticut, on May 4. Keys that had been found in the Pathfinder fit the home's front door. Materials related to the bomb were found in his apartment and its garage, including packaging for alarm clocks, fireworks, and fertilizer.

=== Motive and other planned attacks ===
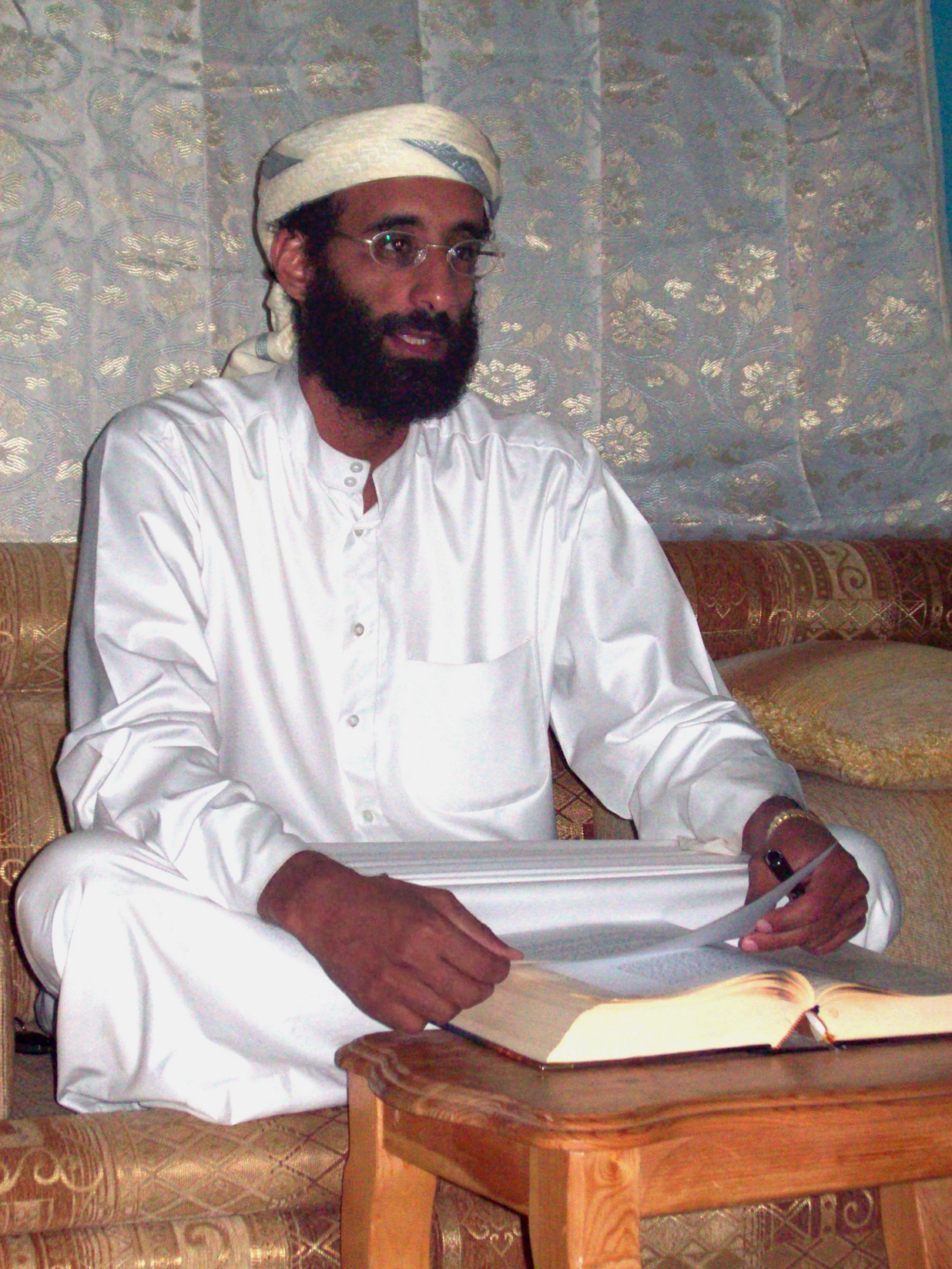
Anwar al-Awlaki, whom Shahzad was reportedly inspired by and in contact with

In the years leading up to the attack, friends later recalled that Shahzad had become more introverted, religious, and fixed in his views. He reportedly felt that Islam itself was under attack. During interrogation, Shahzad stated that he was angry with the US because of repeated CIA drone strikes in Pakistan. Holder said that Shahzad had admitted involvement in the bombing attempt, and had confirmed that it "was a terrorist plot".

Using the internet, Shahzad made contact with militants and jihadists, including Baitullah Mehsud, the founder of the Pakistani Taliban who was killed in a drone strike in 2009. He was also in contact with Yemeni-American extremist imam Anwar al-Awlaki, later telling interrogators that al-Awlaki had "inspired" him to take up the cause of al-Qaeda. Al-Awlaki is known for having had contact with a number of people who were later involved in terrorist attacks, including three of the September 11th hijackers; Nidal Hasan, who perpetrated the 2009 Fort Hood shooting; and Christmas Day bomber Umar Farouk Abdulmutallab. His militant English-language online content, which calls for holy war against the West, is considered the catalyst for a number of attacks, including Shahzad's. One American official called al-Awlaki a crucial influence on Shahzad.

Shahzad reportedly had four other high-profile targets in the New York area he was planning to attack if his first attack had been successful. On his list were Rockefeller Center, Grand Central Terminal, the World Financial Center (just across from World Trade Center/Ground Zero) and Sikorsky, a Connecticut-based company that manufactures helicopters for the U.S. military.

=== Prosecution ===
On May 4, federal prosecutors charged Shahzad with five counts, including attempting to use a weapon of mass destruction and trying to kill and maim people within the U.S. Two of his felonies carry a maximum of a life sentence if convicted, and two of his other counts carry mandatory minimum terms of 5 and 30 years, which means that if he is convicted of both, he will face at least 35 years in prison.

Shahzad voluntarily waived his Miranda rights and his right to an initial speedy court appearance, and agreed to answer questions. He was interrogated by the recently formed High-Value Interrogation Group. Some commentators stated that his willingness to talk to investigators did not appear to be an attempt to gain leniency. Civil rights lawyer Ron Kuby, who had represented other terrorism defendants, said that in his experience terrorists usually talked freely because they had no interest in fighting the charges. Ken Wainstein, a former United States Attorney who had headed the Justice Department's anti-terrorism efforts, said that he found many were motivated by pride.

Faisal was arraigned on May 18 and was held at the Metropolitan Correctional Center in Manhattan. On June 17, a federal grand jury indicted Shahzad on terror charges, to which Shazad pled guilty. On October 5, 2010, he was convicted and sentenced to life imprisonment without the possibility of parole by a federal judge in New York. He responded to the sentence by saying that "the defeat of the U.S. is imminent." When asked by the judge, "Didn't you swear allegiance to this country?" Shahzad, a naturalized U.S. citizen, replied, "I sweared, but I didn't mean it."

== Other related arrests ==
=== United States ===
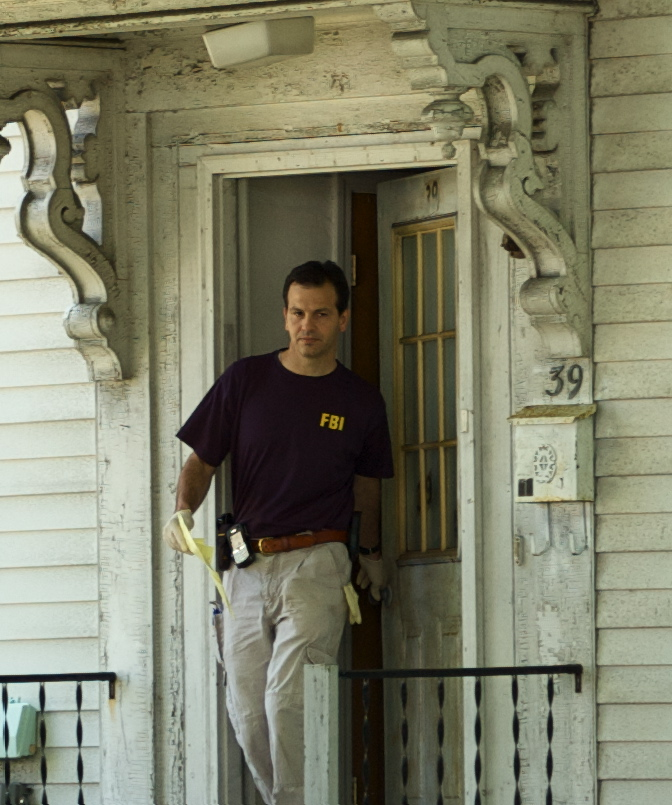
An FBI agent at the scene of the Watertown search

On May 13, investigators searched several locations in the northeastern U.S. in relation to the investigation and arrested three Pakistani men on immigration violations. The FBI also conducted searches at a gas station in the nearby town of Brookline, in Camden and Cherry Hill, New Jersey, and in Centereach and Shirley, New York, on Long Island. U.S. Attorney General Eric Holder said there was evidence the men had provided money to Shahzad through an informal money transfer network (known as a hawala), but it was not yet clear if they were aware of the bombing plot.

Two of the men arrested were living in a home in Watertown, Massachusetts: 27-year-old Aftab Ali Khan and 43-year-old Pir Khan. Although he denied knowing Shahzad, an envelope with Shahzad's name and phone number written on it were found in Aftab Ali Khan's belongings. Shahzad was also found as a contact on a cell phone belonging to him. Neither man was charged in connection to the bombing. Aftab Ali Khan was deported to Pakistan in 2011. Pir Khan denied any connection to Shahzad and was released in August 2010 pending a residency hearing scheduled for October 2010.

The third man arrested was Mohammad Shafiq Rahman, a 33-year-old computer programmer living in South Portland, Maine. He had met Shahzad while living in Connecticut in the early 2000s, but there was no further known link between the men. Rahman was never charged with the bombing, and he was released on bail for the immigration charges in August 2010.

=== Pakistan ===
Representative Jane Harman, a California Democrat and Chairman of the House Homeland Security Subcommittee on Intelligence, Information Sharing, and Terrorism Risk Assessment, said Pakistani officials had arrested "alleged facilitators" as part of a "far broader investigation." Pakistani authorities arrested more than a dozen suspects in the investigation of the attempted car bombing, including two or three people at a house in Karachi's Nazimabad district where Shahzad is said to have stayed.

Pakistani intelligence officials said a man named Tauseef Ahmed was detained in Karachi in connection with the case. Ahmed, a friend of Shahzad, had used email to speak with Shahzad and was believed to have met with him in the U.S. in March 2010. Muhammad Rehan, an alleged militant who had spent time with Shahzad in Pakistan in July 2009, was arrested in Karachi at a mosque known for links to the militant group Jaish-e-Muhammad. On May 6, Pakistani officials said U.S. law enforcement officers had joined them in questioning four alleged members of Jaish-e-Mohammad regarding possible links to Shahzad. A major serving in the Pakistan Army and businessman Salman Ashraf Khan were also arrested.

== Reaction ==
=== Government ===
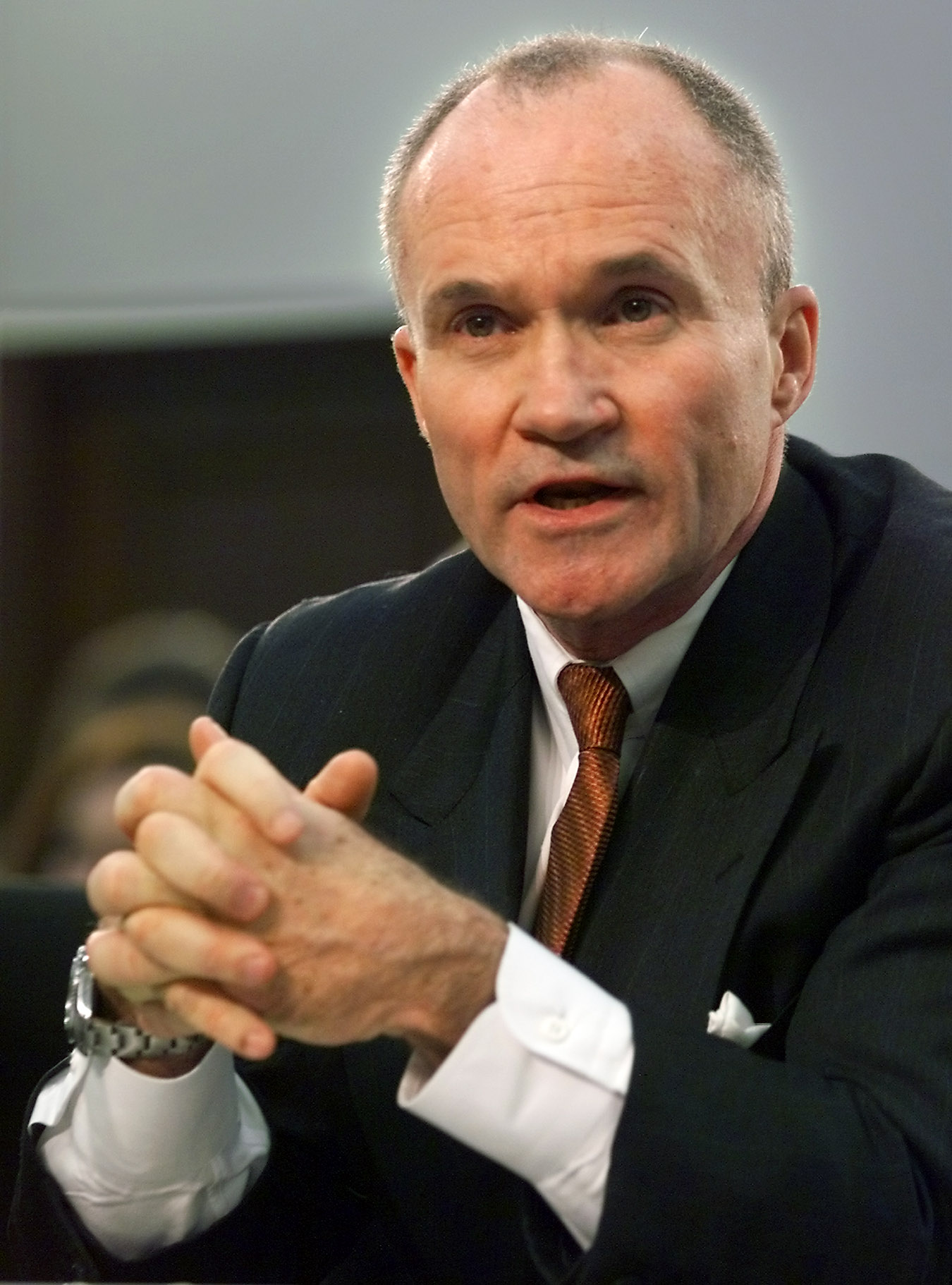
NYPD Commissioner Raymond Kelly

Mayor Michael Bloomberg and Police Commissioner Kelly were in Washington, D.C., to attend the 2010 White House Correspondents' Dinner, but returned immediately to New York after they were informed of the incident. Bloomberg's initial statement was to the false impression that it may have been perpetrated by a domestic terrorist, saying to CBS's Katie Couric, "If I had to guess 25 cents, this would be exactly that: homegrown, or maybe a mentally deranged person, or somebody with a political agenda that doesn't like the health care bill or something. It could be anything." Bloomberg warned against retribution, saying, "We will not tolerate any bias or any backlash against Muslim New Yorkers." Commissioner Kelly said that to terrorists, "New York is America, and they want to come back to kill us."

President Barack Obama called the bomb attempt a "sobering reminder of the times in which we live", and said that Americans "will not cower in fear" as a result of it. He telephoned Duane Jackson, one of the vendors, to thank him for alerting police. Attorney General Eric Holder called it a "terrorist act". White House spokesman Robert Gibbs, similarly, said "Anybody that has the type of material that they had in a car in Times Square, I would say that was intended to terrorize, absolutely. And I would say that whoever did that would be categorized as a terrorist, yes."

On May 6, 2010, then-senator Joe Lieberman, a Connecticut independent and chairman of the Senate Homeland Security Committee, introduced the "Terrorist Expatriation Act" as bipartisan legislation in the United States Senate. The bill, which would have revoked the U.S. citizenship of Americans who joined or supported foreign terrorist groups, was an amendment to a 1940 law which stripped citizenship from individuals who joined either Japanese or German armies. Identical legislation was introduced in the United States House of Representatives by Pennsylvania Congressman Jason Altmire, a Democrat, and Charlie Dent, a Republican. The bill's supporters said that the amendment would prevent terrorism suspects from re-entering the U.S. on American passports, and would make it possible to prosecute suspects in military, rather than civilian court. The bill was criticized by Muslim advocacy groups, who said it would unfairly target Muslims, and legal scholars, who doubted its constitutionality. It ultimately failed to pass into law.

=== Muslims ===
Muslim leaders in the U.S. urged the public to "distinguish between acts of violence and terror and Islam, a religion that they said encourages peace and love", reported The Wall Street Journal . It has further been pointed out that the media largely ignored that the Senegalese man who raised the alarm was also Muslim.

The Financial Times reported that some residents of Pakistan felt that Shahzad's arrest was an American plot intended to discredit Islam.

=== Criticism ===
Some criticism followed partisan lines. Conservative political commentator S. E. Cupp, for example, wrote that there was a culture of political correctness towards Islamic extremism in the White House, juxtaposing it with the administration's supposedly more aggressive stance towards Christian militia groups. Michael B. Mukasey, the former U.S. Attorney General who served during the George W. Bush administration, lamented the leakage of what he termed "intelliporn"—intelligence information that is disclosed by the media because it is "fun to read about" even though it causes harm by disclosing critical information to terrorists. The Arabic newspaper Asharq Al-Awsat carried an editorial praising Obama for not mentioning the word Islam in connection with Shahzad.

Professor Fouad Ajami characterized the car bombing attempt as part of "a long twilight war, the struggle against radical Islamism". He described Shahzad, Nidal Malik Hasan, and Anwar Awlaki as being part of "a deadly breed of combatants in this new kind of war", for which the United States was simultaneously "the object of their dreams, and the scapegoat onto which they project their deepest malignancies". In Dubai's Gulf News, a columnist responded to Ajami's column by writing: "What is now needed is for smart police officers in the East and the West to work together to arrest and bring to justice criminals who have little respect for life itself – though we must also try politicians who launched perpetual wars and thinkers who pretended to add value by opining that our civilizations are doomed to clash."

== Claims of responsibility ==
Initially, according to a report by the Associated Press, a Pakistani Taliban group claimed responsibility for an attack against the U.S. in a video posted on YouTube, saying it was revenge for the killing of Baitullah Mehsud and the top leaders of al-Qaida in Iraq — Abu Omar al-Baghdadi and Abu Ayyub al-Masri — as well as for general American "interference and terrorism in Muslim Countries, especially in Pakistan." However, "The tape makes no specific reference to the attack; it does not mention that it was a car bomb or that it took place in New York City". According to The New York Times and the New York Daily News, the same group has made far-fetched, false claims for other attacks in the past.

On May 6, however, a Pakistani Taliban spokesman said it was not involved with the attempted bombing, but added: "Such attacks are welcome. We have no relation with Faisal. However, he is our Muslim brother. We feel proud of Faisal. He did a brave job." On May 9, The New York Times opined that the retraction may have been prompted by fears that admission of responsibility might result in an attack on the Pakistan Taliban in North Waziristan by the U.S. or Pakistan.

On May 9, however, Holder said "We've now developed evidence that shows the Pakistani Taliban was behind the attack," directed the plot, and may have financed it. The Taliban in Pakistan is believed by some military intelligence officials to have joined forces with al-Qaeda. John Brennan, President Obama's chief counterterrorism adviser, said: "He was trained by [the Taliban in Pakistan]. He received funding from them. He was basically directed here to the United States to carry out this attack." Some military intelligence officials believe the Taliban in Pakistan has joined forces with al-Qaeda. John Brennan, President Obama's chief counterterrorism adviser, said: "It's a group that is closely allied with al-Qaeda. They train together, they plan together, they plot together. They are almost indistinguishable."

Several other groups claimed responsibility, without any corroborating evidence or verified data.

== See also ==
- Terrorism in the United States
- Islamic terrorism
- Islamic extremism in the United States
- List of foiled Islamic terrorist plots in the post-9/11 United States
- List of terrorist incidents in 2010
