= Ajang Ajang group =

Abu Sayyaf terrorist cell

The Ajang Ajang group (Tausug: Baanan Ajang Ajang, Sulat Sūg: بَأَنَنْ اَجَڠْ٢) was a cell within the terrorist organization Abu Sayyaf. The Ajang Ajang group was active within the southern Philippines. The group specialized in attacks using bombs. The word Ajang Ajang is a Tausug word for "orphans", describing the group consisting of people who lost a loved one due to war.

== Terrorist acts ==
On December 31, 2018, one of two bombs exploded and killed two people and wounded 34 in South Seas Mall in Cotabato City. The two bombs carried the signature of the Ajang Ajang's elders, Islamic State.

The Ajang Ajang group claimed to be behind the Jolo Cathedral bombings on January 27, 2019, that killed 20 people and injured 102, and are suspected to be behind the mosque bombing in Talon-Talon, Zamboanga City, that caused 2 fatalities and 4 injuries.
