= Jolo Cathedral =

Roman Catholic church in Sulu, Philippines

- Cathedral of Our Lady of Mount Carmel
- Catedral de Nuestra Señora del Carmen (Spanish)
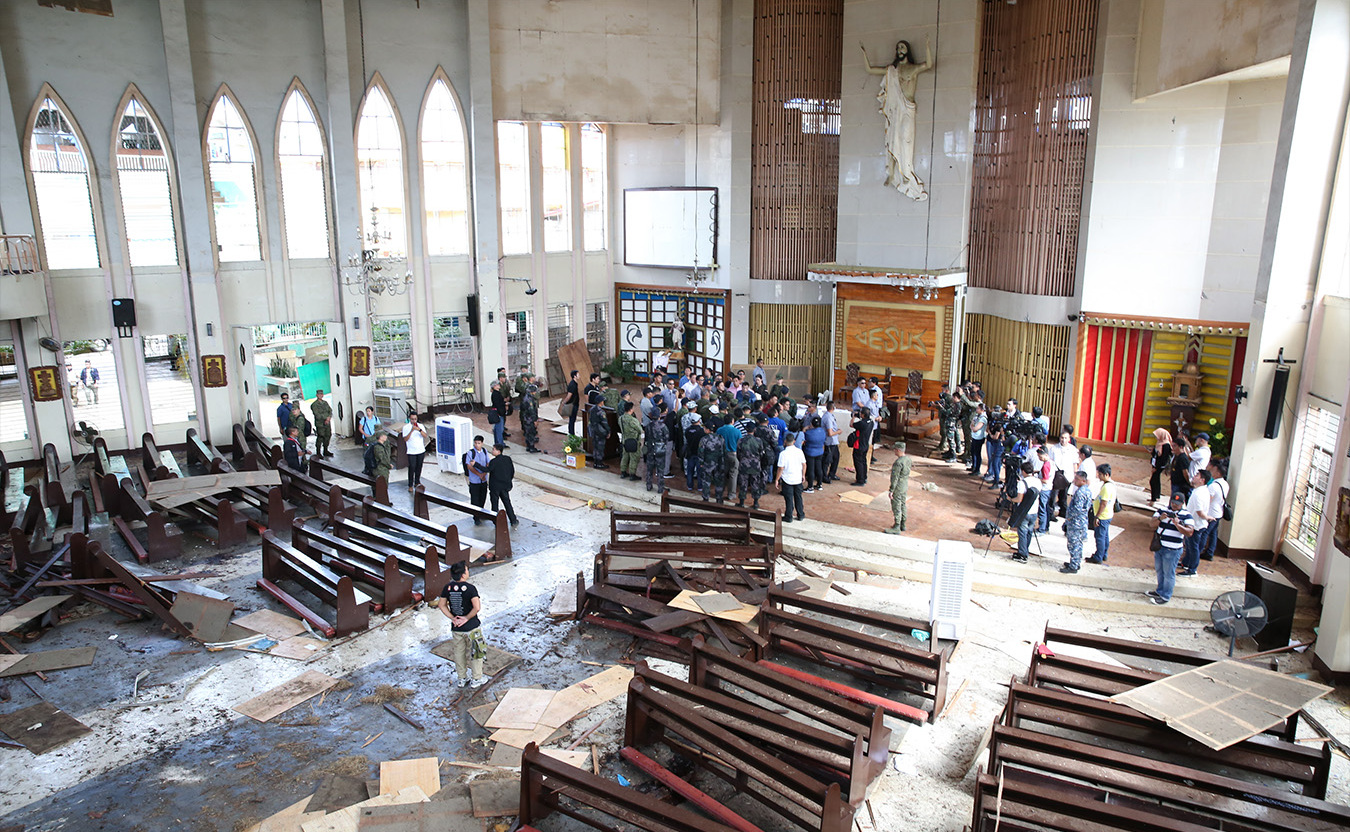
- Cathedral interior after the 2019 bombings

- Location in Mindanao Location in the Philippines
- 6°03′09″N 121°00′03″E
- Location: Jolo, Sulu
- Country: Philippines
- Denomination: Roman Catholic

History
- Status: Cathedral
- Dedication: Our Lady of Mount Carmel

Architecture
- Functional status: Active
- Architectural type: Cathedral
- Years built: 1864

Specifications
- Materials: Adobe and cement

Administration
- Diocese: Apostolic Vicariate of Jolo

Clergy
- Vicar(s): Bishop Charlie M. Inzon, Apostolic Vicar

The Cathedral of Our Lady of Mount Carmel, commonly known as Jolo Cathedral, is a Roman Catholic cathedral in Jolo, Sulu and the seat of the Apostolic Vicariate of Jolo. The cathedral is located in Jolo, a volcanic island in Sulu Province of the Bangsamoro Autonomous Region in Muslim Mindanao in the Philippines. The cathedral is dedicated to the Virgin Mary under the title Our Lady of Mount Carmel.

== Attacks ==
On January 10, 2010, a grenade thrown at the tombs of Francis Joseph McSorley and Benjamin de Jesus, two former bishops, caused no injuries but shattered the windows. The blast occurred an hour before a mass was scheduled to be celebrated. There were no injuries.

On May 20, 2010, a grenade exploded in front of the cathedral at 9:30 in the evening. The cathedral suffered minor damage. There were no reported fatalities or injuries.

=== 2019 bombings ===
On January 27, 2019, the cathedral was bombed during a mass, killing at least 18 people and injuring 82 others. The Islamic State claimed responsibility for the attack.

The church building was repaired following the attacks. It was reconsecrated in July 2019.

=== 2020 bombing ===
On August 24, 2020, two bombings occurred in Jolo, killing seven soldiers, six civilians, one police officer and a bomber, while 75 people were wounded. One of the attacks was carried out by a female suicide bomber near the cathedral.
