= Jolo, Sulu =

Capital of Sulu province, Philippines

Jolo Tiyanggi Tausug: تِیَڠْگِ
- Municipality
- Municipality of Jolo
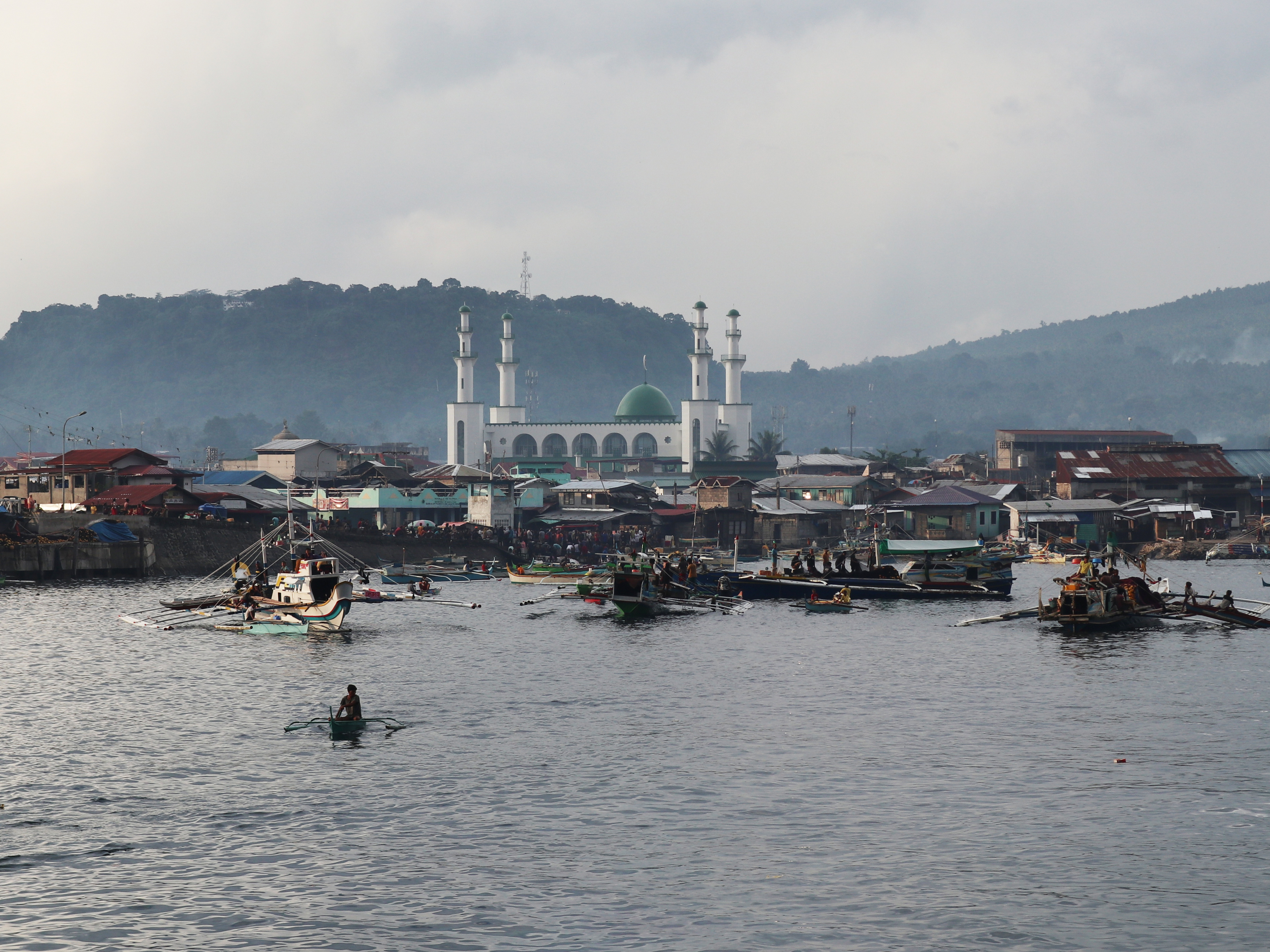
- Skyline with the Tulay Central Mosque in the background.

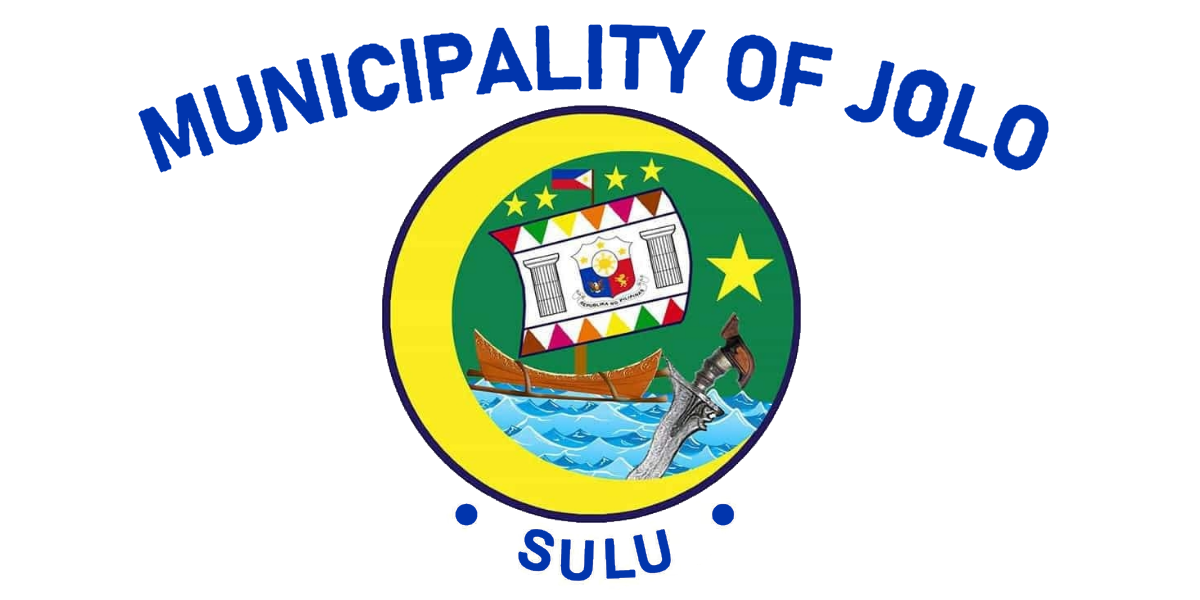
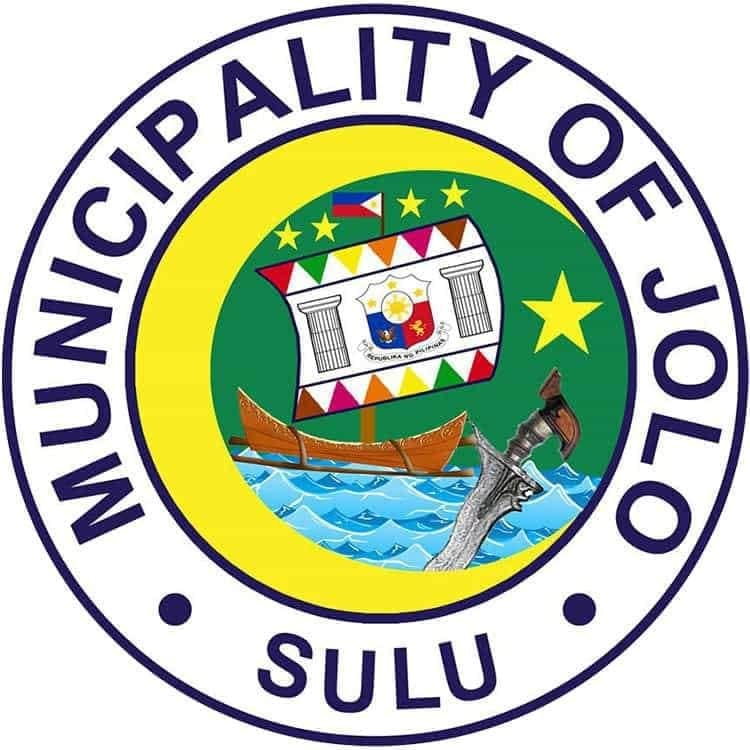
- Flag Seal

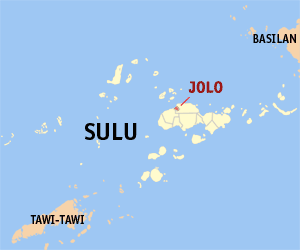
- Map of Sulu with Jolo highlighted
- Interactive map of Jolo
- Location within the Philippines
- Coordinates: 6°03′N 121°00′E
- Country: Philippines
- Region: Zamboanga Peninsula
- Province: Sulu
- District: 1st district
- Established: February 11, 1904
- Barangays: 8 (see Barangays)

Government
  - Type: Sangguniang Bayan
  - Mayor: Edsir Q. Tan
  - Vice Mayor: Khumaidy A. Tan
  - Representative: Samier A. Tan
  - Municipal Council: Members: Edsir A. Tan II; Alkramer R. Izquierdo; Hussin A. Amin II; John S. Schuck III; Ezzel Arab U. Abubakar; Ahmed J. Amilhamja; Khaizar E. Gonzales; Nurjanjam T. Alfad
  - Electorate: 48,365 voters (2025)

Area
  - Total: 22.24 km^{2} (8.59 sq mi)
- Elevation: 70 m (230 ft)
- Highest elevation: 430 m (1,410 ft)
- Lowest elevation: 0 m (0 ft)

Population (2024 census)
  - Total: 152,067
  - Density: 6,838/km^{2} (17,710/sq mi)
  - Households: 20,354

Economy
  - Income class: 1st municipal income class
  - Poverty incidence: 11.36% (2023)
  - Revenue: ₱ 421.6 million (2022)
  - Assets: ₱ 173.3 million (2022)
  - Expenditure: ₱ 415.2 million (2022)
  - Liabilities: ₱ 32.09 million (2022)

Service provider
  - Electricity: Sulu Electric Cooperative (SULECO)
- Time zone: UTC+8 (PST)
- ZIP code: 7400
- PSGC: 1906602000
- IDD : area code: +63 (0)68
- Native languages: Tausug; Sama; Yakan; Sabah Malay
- Website: www.jolo.gov.ph

Jolo, officially the Municipality of Jolo ([hoˈlo]; Tausug: Kawman sin Tiyanggi; Tagalog: Bayan ng Jolo; Chavacano: Municipalidad de Jolo), is a municipality and capital of the province of Sulu, Philippines. According to the 2024 census, it has a population of 152,067 people.

== Etymology ==
According to Dr. Najeeb M. Saleeby (1908) and in old maps such as the Velarde map, "Joló" was the historical Spanish spelling of the word "Sulu" that now refers to the province and the whole Sulu Archipelago, which the early Spaniards historically spelt as "Xoló", with the initial letter most likely formerly pronounced with the Early Modern Spanish [ʃ] sound, with [ʃoˈlo] the Spanish pronunciation of Sulu, but later evolved into the Modern Spanish [x], leading to its modern pronunciation [xoˈlo]. In many dialects, the initial sound is glottal, yielding [hoˈlo]. The Spanish version Joló is still used to pertain Sulu (both province, archipelago, and ancient sultanate) in Spanish writings. Meanwhile, the word "Sulu" itself comes from Tausug: Sulug, an older form of Tausug: Sūg, lit. 'sea current'.

== History ==
=== Pre-Colonial period ===
In the 14th century, Arab traders landed on the island to introduce and convert its inhabitants to Islam. The native inhabitants on the island are the Tausūg people. The Tausugs are part of the larger Moro group which dominates the Sulu Archipelago. The Moro had an independent state known as the Sultanate of Sulu, which was politically and economically centered on Jolo, the residence for Sulu Sultanates. The Seat of the Royal Sultanate of Sulu was in Astana Putih, which is Tausug for ‘White Palace’ in Umbul Duwa in the municipality of Indanan on Jolo Island, later on, the capital was moved in Maimbung during the 1800s.

=== Spanish Colonial Period ===
The Spanish failed to conquer and convert the Muslim areas in Mindanao. After colonising the islands in the north, they failed to take over the well-organized sultanates in the south.

==== Trading center ====
The Sulu economy relied on the network of nearby trading partners. The Sultanate benefited from importing rice from northern Philippines, as the Sulu region had a chronic rice shortage. The Sultanate was unable to bring agriculture to its full potential because the area was prone to erratic rainfall and drought.

==== Chinese immigration ====
Since the 15th century, the Sulu Sultanate traded local produce with neighbors and with countries as far as China by sea. Most of the import and export trade was done with Singapore which was estimated to be worth half a million dollars annually. In 1870, the Tausug lost much of their redistributive trade to the Chinese because of the Spanish cruising system and Chinese immigration from Singapore. Mostly originating from the Fujian province, most of the Chinese in Jolo worked as craftsmen, skilled and unskilled laborers and domestic servants for wealthy Tausugs and Chinese. Singapore served as a training ground from which they learned the Malay language and became experienced in dealing with Southeast Asians. It was these Chinese who eventually dominated trade in Jolo and benefited greatly from Jolo's status as an entrepot, and exercised profound influence over the Sulu Sultanate. However, the Sultanate was not keen on the Chinese monopoly. By 1875, Sultan Jamal ul-Azam wanted an English merchant to establish himself in order to break the monopoly at Jolo.

Chinese who lived in Sulu ran guns across a Spanish blockade to supply the Moro Datus and Sultanates with weapons to fight the Spanish, who were engaging in a campaign to subjugate the Moro sultanates on Mindanao. A trade involving the Moros selling slaves and other goods in exchange for guns developed. The Chinese had entered the economy of the sultanate, taking control of nearly the entire Sultanate's economy in Mindanao and dominating the markets. Though the Sultans did not like their economic monopoly, they did business with them. The Chinese set up a trading network between Singapore, Zamboanga, Jolo and Sulu.

The Chinese sold small arms like Enfield and Spencer rifles to the Buayan Datu Uto. They were used to battle the Spanish invasion of Buayan. The Datu paid for the weapons in slaves. The population of Chinese in Mindanao in the 1880s was 1,000. The Chinese ran guns across a Spanish blockade to sell to Mindanao Moros. The purchases of these weapons were paid for by the Moros in slaves in addition to other goods. The main group of people selling guns were the Chinese in Sulu. The Chinese took control of the economy and used steamers to ship goods for exporting and importing. Opium, ivory, textiles, and crockery were among the other goods which the Chinese sold.

The Chinese on Maimbung sent the weapons to the Sulu Sultanate, who used them to battle the Spanish and resist their attacks. A Chinese-Mestizo was one of the Sultan's brothers-in-law, the Sultan was married to his sister. He and the Sultan both owned shares in the ship (named the Far East) which helped smuggled the weapons.

The Spanish launched a surprise offensive under Colonel Juan Arolas in April 1887 by attacking the Sultanate's capital at Maimbung in an effort to crush resistance. Weapons were captured and the property of the Chinese was destroyed and the Chinese were deported to Jolo.

==== Spanish control ====
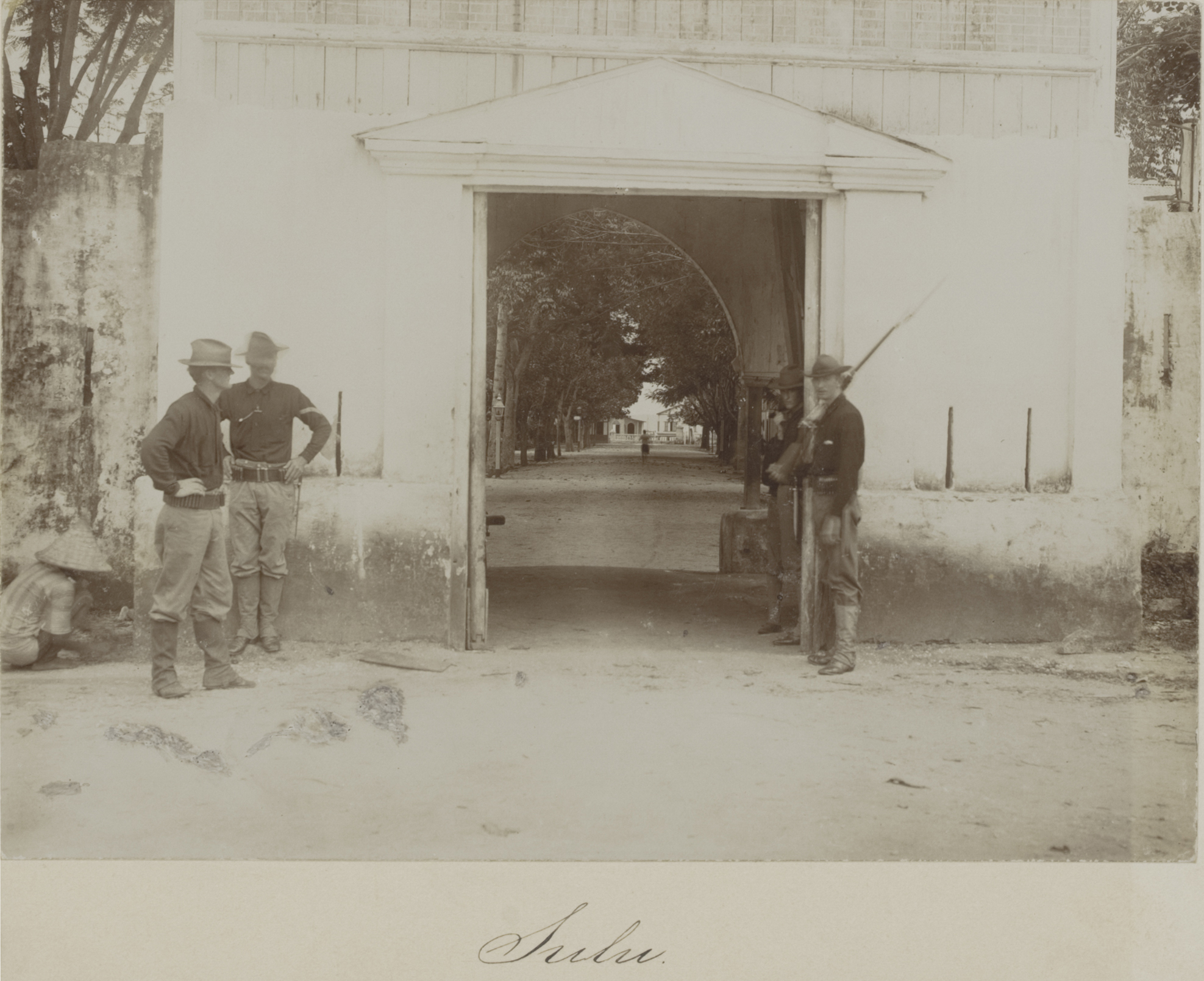
Gates of Jolo, circa 1899

In 1876, the Spanish attempted to gain control of the Muslims by burning Jolo and were successful. In March 1877, The Sulu Protocol was signed between Spain, England and Germany which recognized Spain's rights over Sulu and eased European tensions in the area. The Spanish built the smallest walled city in the world in Jolo. The Spanish and the Sultan of Sulu signed the Treaty of Peace on July 22, 1878, in which the sultan accepted Spanish sovereignty over Sulu and Tawi-Tawi (Note: Controversy exists over terminology used in the Spanish-language and Tausug-language versions of the treaty and whether Spain was given complete sovereignty over the Sulu archipelago, including Basilan, or whether a "protectorate-ship" was entered into) but Sulu and Tawi-Tawi remained partially ruled by the Spanish as their sovereignty was limited to military stations and garrisons and pockets of civilian settlements.

==== Trading decline ====
Trade suffered heavily in 1892 when three steamers used for trade were lost in a series of storms on the trade route between Singapore and Jolo. The traders in Singapore lost so heavily as a result that they refused to accept trade unless it was paid for in cash. Along with the fear of increased taxation, many Chinese left to other parts of the Archipelago as Jolo lost its role as the regional entrepot. The Tausug had already abandoned trading when the Chinese arrived. Thus, Jolo never fully gained its previous trading status. However, the Chinese continued to dominate trade throughout the Archipelago and Mindanao.

=== American Colonial Period ===
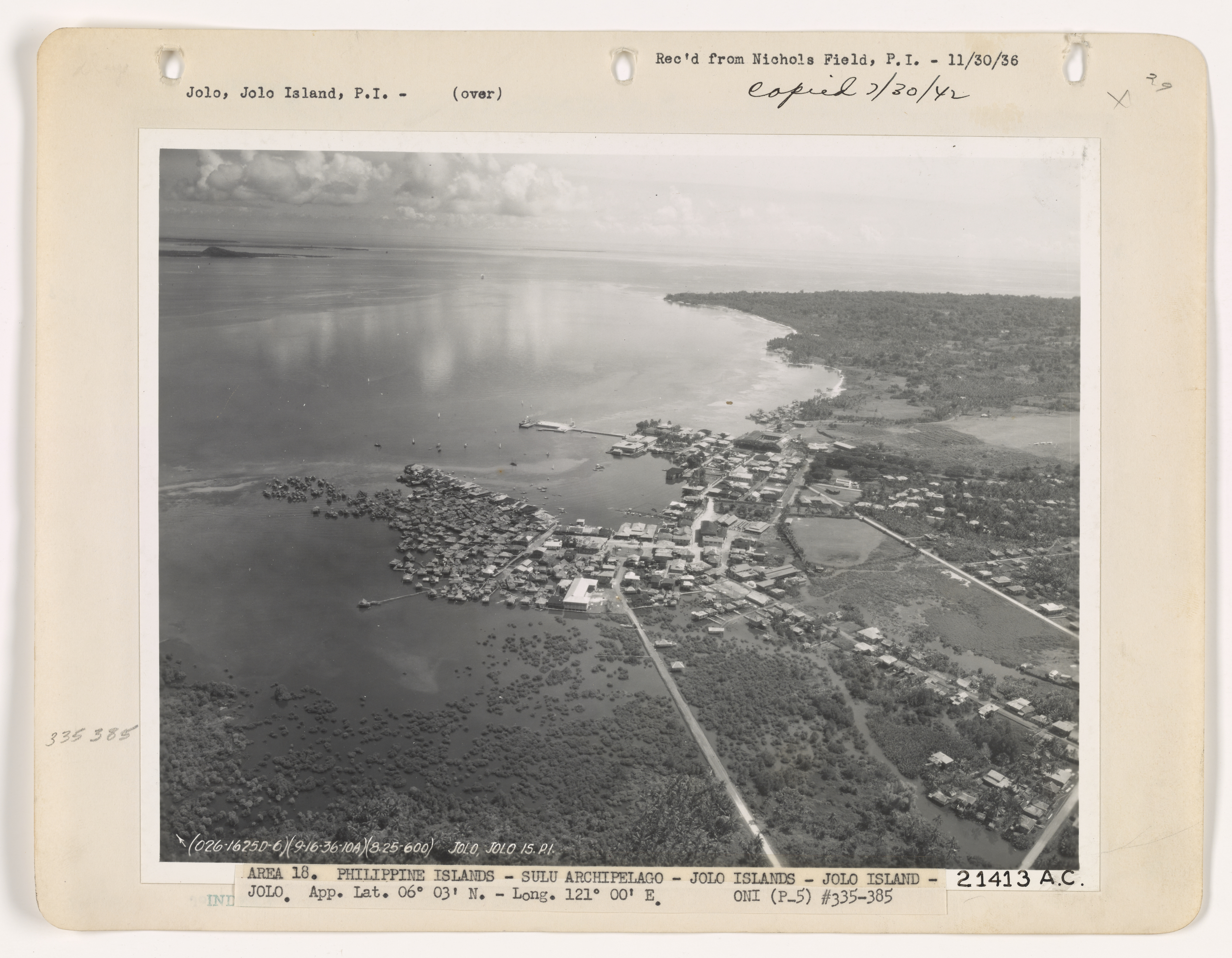
Aerial view of Jolo, 1936

In 1899 following the Treaty of Paris of 1898, sovereignty over the Philippines was transferred from Spain to the United States who attempted to forcibly incorporate the Muslim areas into the Philippine state. The American colonizers eventually took over the southern regions with force (see Moro Rebellion). The Sultanate of Sulu was abolished in 1936.

=== Independence ===
As a center of regional commerce, Sulu and Jolo became very prosperous and progressive in the years after the end of World War II and the establishment of the Third Philippine Republic. By 1970, the province ranked 37rd in the Philippines in terms of number of households with piped water, and 38th in terms of households with electricity. As the capital of the province, Jolo even saw international trade with countries like China and Russia. This changed suddenly after the 1974 Siege of Jolo, which destroyed infrastructure and led to capital flight and brain drain. By 1990 Jolo had dropped to 52nd in terms of number of households with piped water and 73rd in terms of households with electricity.

In 1974, Jolo was occupied by members of the Moro National Liberation Front, and put under siege by the Philippine Army in the Battle of Jolo. The town suffered extensive damage, with Filipino forces bombarding it from the air.

== Geography ==
The town of Jolo is located on the north-west side of the Jolo Island, which is located south-west of the tip of Zamboanga Peninsula on Mindanao island. The island is situated between the provinces of Basilan and Tawi-Tawi, bounded by Sulu Sea to the north and Celebes Sea to the south.

Jolo is a volcanic island, which lies at the center of the Sulu Archipelago covering 890 square kilometres (340 sq mi). The Sulu Archipelago is an island chain in the Southwest Philippines between Mindanao and Borneo, which is made up of 900 islands of volcanic and coral origin covering an area of 2,688 square kilometres (1,038 sq mi). There are numerous volcanoes and craters around Jolo with the last known activity (an earthquake assumed resulting from a submarine eruption from an undetermined location) taking place on September 21, 1897, causing devastating tsunamis in the archipelago and western Mindanao.

=== Barangays ===
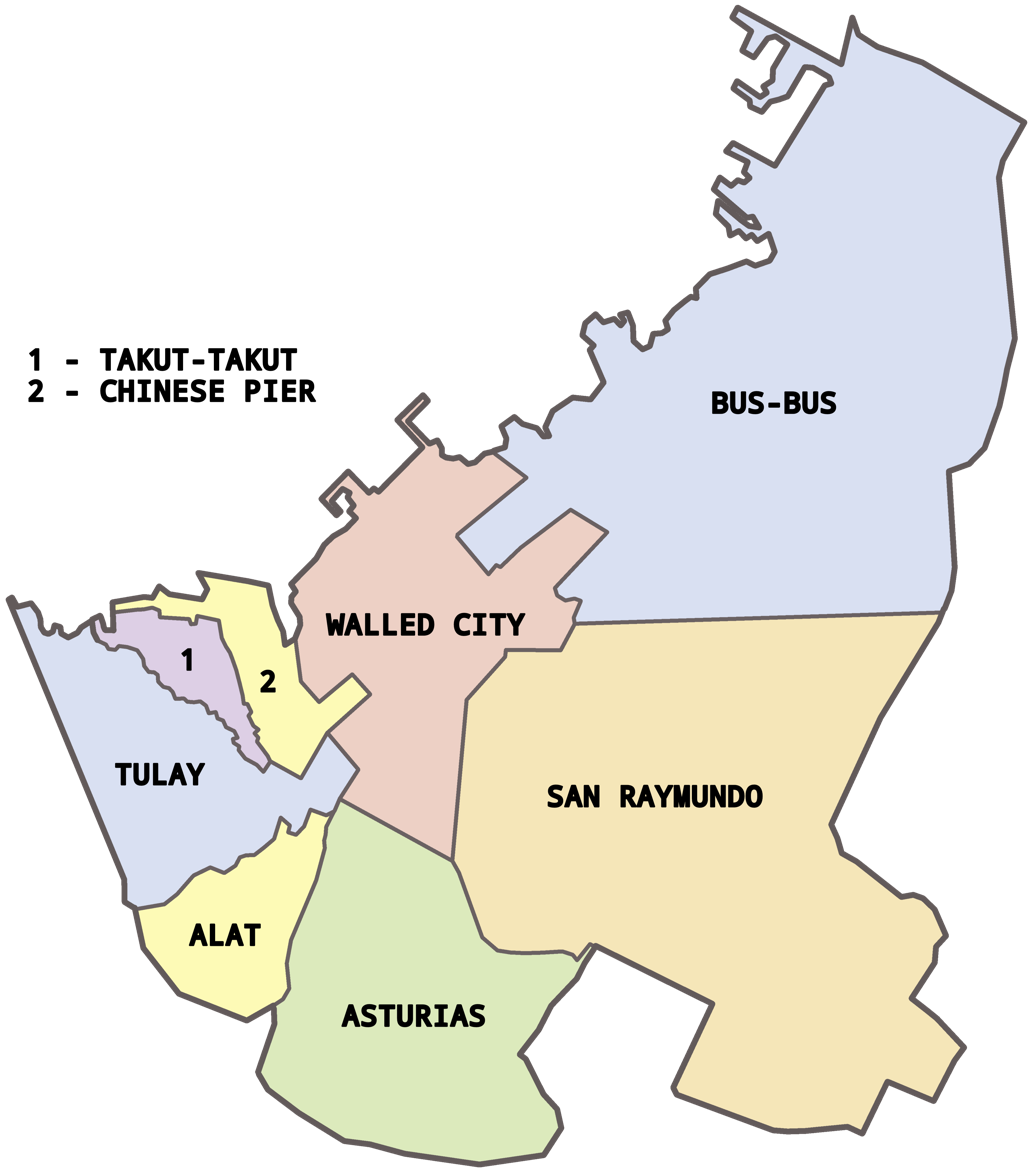
Political subdivisions of the Municipality of Jolo

Jolo is politically subdivided into 8 barangays. Each barangay consists of puroks while some have sitios.

- Alat
- Asturias
- Bus-Bus
- Takut Takut
- Tulay
- San Raymundo
- Chinese Pier
- Walled City (Poblacion)

=== Climate ===
Jolo has a consistently very warm to hot, oppressively humid, and wet tropical rainforest climate (Köppen Af).

Climate data for Jolo, Sulu
Month	Jan	Feb	Mar	Apr	May	Jun	Jul	Aug	Sep	Oct	Nov	Dec	Year
Mean daily maximum °C (°F)	27 (81)	27 (81)	27 (81)	28 (82)	28 (82)	28 (82)	28 (82)	28 (82)	28 (82)	28 (82)	28 (82)	28 (82)	28 (82)
Mean daily minimum °C (°F)	27 (81)	26 (79)	27 (81)	27 (81)	28 (82)	28 (82)	27 (81)	27 (81)	27 (81)	27 (81)	27 (81)	27 (81)	27 (81)
Average rainfall mm (inches)	170 (6.7)	130 (5.1)	125 (4.9)	122 (4.8)	229 (9.0)	286 (11.3)	254 (10.0)	248 (9.8)	182 (7.2)	257 (10.1)	233 (9.2)	188 (7.4)	2,424 (95.5)
Average rainy days	18.3	15.3	15.2	14.6	22.8	24.0	24.3	23.3	20.5	22.6	21.9	19.3	242.1
Source: Meteoblue (modeled/calculated data, not measured locally)

== Demographics ==
Population census of Jolo
Year	Pop.	±% p.a.
1903	44,718	—
1918	20,230	−5.15%
1939	12,571	−2.24%
1948	18,282	+4.25%
1960	33,259	+5.11%
1970	46,586	+3.42%
1975	37,623	−4.19%
1980	52,429	+6.86%
1990	53,055	+0.12%
1995	76,948	+7.21%
2000	87,998	+2.92%
2007	140,307	+6.65%
2010	118,307	−6.02%
2015	125,564	+1.14%
2020	137,266	+1.89%
2024	152,067	+2.49%
Source: Philippine Statistics Authority

=== Languages ===
Tulay Central Mosque, the largest mosque in Sulu

The majority of people who live in Jolo speak Tausug. English is also used, especially in schools and different offices. Hokkien and Malay are also spoken by some traders. Other languages include Sama and Yakan, while Chavacano is also spoken by Christian and Muslim locals who maintain contacts and trade with the mainland Zamboanga Peninsula and Basilan.

According to the 2000 Philippine census by the Philippine Statistics Authority, the Tausug language ranks number 14 with 1,022,000 speakers all over the country, the speakers mainly in the Western Mindanao area to which Sulu belongs.

=== Religion ===
About 99% of the people living in Jolo practice Islam, but there is also a significant Christian minority consisting of Roman Catholics and Protestants. Tausugs were the first Filipinos to adopt Islam when the Muslim missionary Karim ul-Makhdum came to Sulu in 1380. Other missionaries included Rajah Baguinda and the Muslim Arabian scholar Sayid Abu Bakr, who became the first Sultan of Sulu. The family and community relations are based on their understanding of Islamic law. The Tausug are also heavily influenced by their pre-Islamic traditions.

Tulay Central Mosque is the largest mosque in town and in the province. There are also numerous mosques located in different areas and barangays around Jolo. Our Lady of Mount Carmel Cathedral is a Roman Catholic cathedral located in the town center and is the biggest church in town. "Jolo Alliance Evangelical Church" (formerly known as Jolo Evangelical Church) of the Christian and Missionary Alliance Churches of the Philippines (CAMACOP) also co-exist along with the Catholic Church since the 1900s, making it the first Protestant church in the archipelago.

== Culture ==
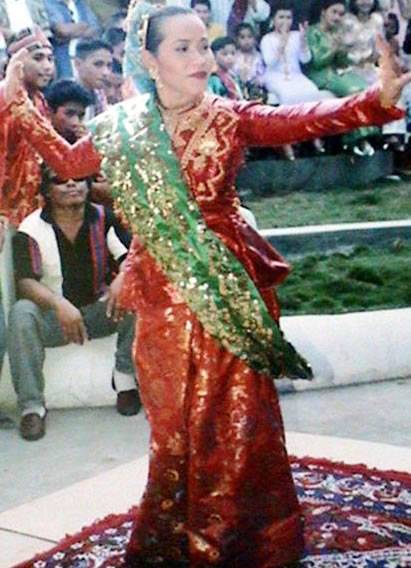
Tausug woman in traditional garb, performing the Pangalay

Bangsamoro or Moroland is the homeland of the Moro, which is a Spanish term used for Muslims. The majority of Jolo's people are Tausugs – the ethnic group that dominates the Sulu Archipelago. Tausug derives from the words tau meaning “man” and sug meaning “current”, which translates to “ people of the current”, because they were known to be seafarers with military and merchant skills. The Tausugs are known as the warrior tribe with excellent fighting skills.

Before the Tausugs adopted Islam, the Tausugs were organized into kauman and were governed by a patriarchal form of government with the individual datus as heads of their own communities. The source of law was the Adat which the Tausugs followed strictly.

The Tausug arts and handicrafts have a mix of Islamic and Indonesian influences. Pangalay is a popular celebratory dance at Tausug weddings, which can last weeks depending on the financial status and agreement of the families. They dance to the music of kulintangan, gabbang, and agong. Another traditional dance of courtship is the Pangalay ha Agong. In this dance, two Tausug warriors compete for the attention of a woman using an agong (large, deep, brass gong) to demonstrate their competence and skill.

A large portion of the population in Jolo is of Chinese descent. Between 1770 and 1800, 18,000 Chinese came from South China to trade and many of them stayed. In 1803, Portuguese Captain Juan Carvalho reported that there were 1,200 Chinese living in the town. The reorientation of the Sulu trade patterns caused an influx of Chinese immigrants from Singapore.

== Economy ==
Poverty Incidence of Jolo

Source: Philippine Statistics Authority

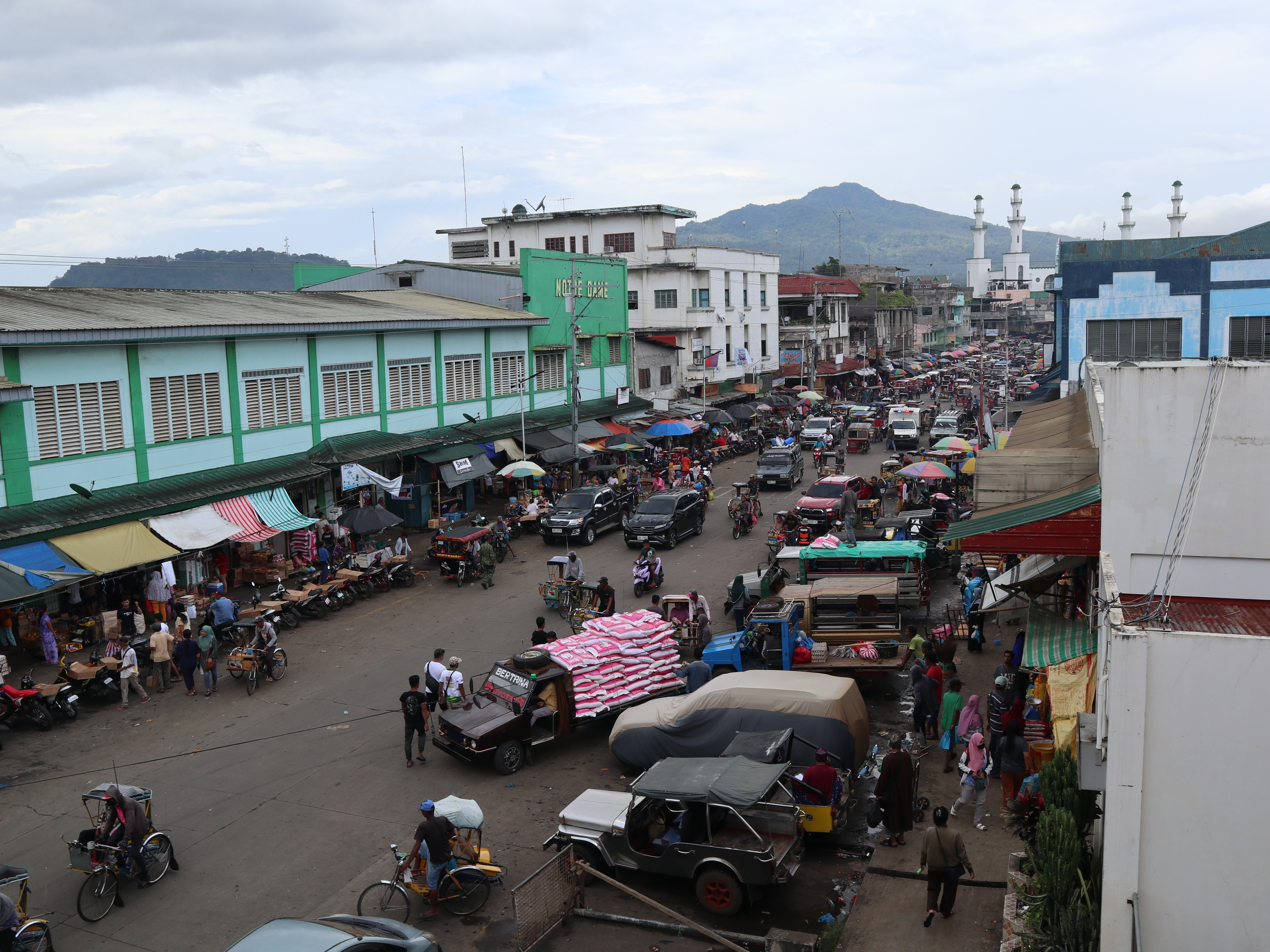
Downtown Jolo

=== Industry ===
In Jolo, most of the residents are in the agriculture industry. Agricultural products include coconut, cassava, abaca, coffee, lanzones, jackfruit, durian, mangosteen and marang. Jolo is the only municipality in Sulu that does not farm seaweed. Fishing is the most important industry; otherwise people engage in the industries of boat building, mat weaving, coffee processing, and fruit preservation.

=== Banking ===
There were different banks operating in Jolo and serving the people of Jolo for their needs. These included the Philippine National Bank, Metrobank, Allied Bank, Al-Amanah Islamic Bank, Land Bank and Development Bank of the Philippines. Automated teller machines (ATMs) are also available in selected bank branches.

=== Economic growth ===
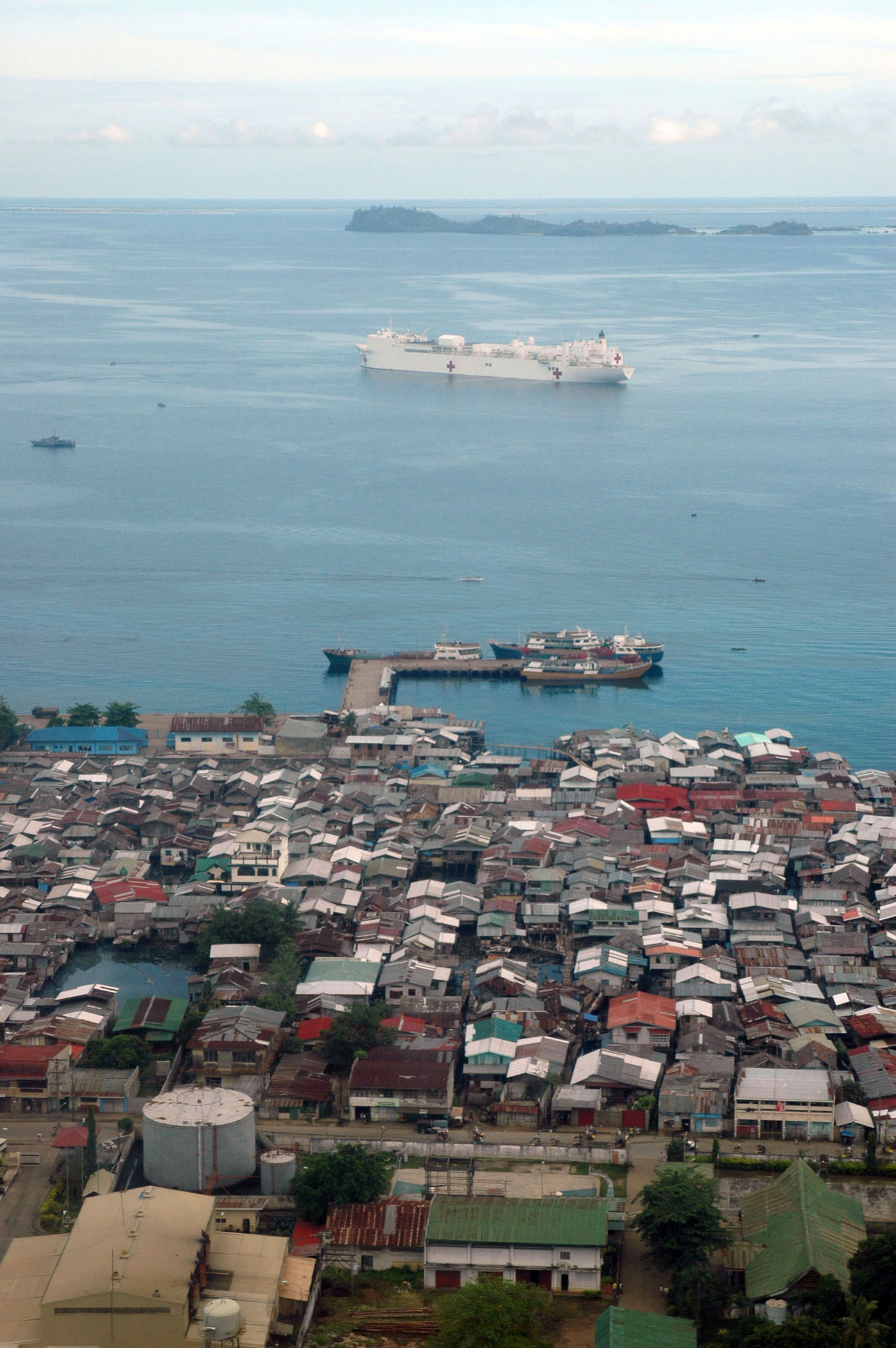
View of Jolo, with USNS Mercy in the background.

Economic development in Jolo has been hampered by instability, violence and unrest caused by the presence of several Islamist separatist groups in the Bangsamoro. The long-running separatist insurgency has made these Muslim-dominated islands some of the poorest regions in the nation. Jolo has faced a large degree of lawlessness and poverty. Jolo is once the main stronghold for the Al-Qaeda-linked Abu Sayyaf terror group, and these conditions are ideal for militant recruitment. However, the situation has improved especially after 2024 since the US contribution to the Operation Enduring Freedom – Philippines and involvement of foreign investors from other countries to improve social condition and developing the region's economy together with increased military operations and security from the Philippine authorities that greatly weaken the Abu Sayyaf and deplete their former source of income from criminal activities.

In 2007, United States Undersecretary of State for Public Diplomacy and Public Affairs Karen Hughes and US Ambassador Kristie Kenney visited Jolo to learn about US government-sponsored projects for ‘development, peace and prosperity’ in the region. The United States Agency for International Development (USAID) has funded a ‘farm-to-market’ road between Maimbung and Jolo to help farmers transport agricultural produce to the market. On her visit, Kenney announced the $3 million plan to improve the Jolo Airport. Since 1997, USAID has spent $4 million a year in the region. Other institutions involved are the World Bank, JICA and AusAID.

The Filipino government has spent over P39 million for development and infrastructure in Sulu. In October 2008, the Provincial Government of Sulu in cooperation with the Local Water Utilities Administration (LWUA), the United States Agency for International Development (USAID), the Mindanao Economic Development Council (MEDCO) and the Jolo Mainland Water District (JMWD) started the construction of a 54 million pesos project to upgrade the water supply system in Jolo.

== Peace and order ==
=== Clan feud ===
In present-day Sulu, there is a degree of lawlessness and clan-based politics. These clan lines are based along family ties, which started after Arthur Amaral proposed marriage to a woman from a rival clan. The rejected proposal caused a family feud which forced families to take sides. There are 100,000 rifles circling the Sulu archipelago. Almost every household owns a gun, and the clans often settle disputes with violence. Most of the disputes between clans revolve around land. The clan-based society makes it extremely difficult for police to impose law. There are several gun shootings and the Filipino Army is often called in to settle disputes. In April 2008, the Jolo Zone of Peace, which was supported by the Geneva-based Centre for Humanitarian Dialogue (CHD), was established where firearms were restricted in mediating conflicts between clans. The Sulu government is attempting to spread this zone of peace into the countryside.

=== Abu Sayyaf ===
The island was considered dangerous for foreigners, especially Americans, as militants threatened to shoot or abduct them on the spot. Much of the anger comes from when American colonizers killed 1000 men, women and children, who had retreated up Mount Dajo in 1906 after refusing to pay taxes, in the First Battle of Bud Dajo during the Philippine–American War. However, the American image has improved since American development plans for the region were carried out.

The most radical separatist Islamic group Abu Sayyaf claims to be fighting for an Islamic state independent of the Roman Catholic Philippine government. The group has strongholds in Jolo and Basilan. Driven by poverty and high rewards, a significant number of local residents are suspected to work for them. The Abu Sayyaf has committed a series of kidnappings. On April 23, 2000, the Abu Sayyaf raided the Malaysian resort island of Sipadan and kidnapped 21 tourists from Germany, France, Finland and South Africa and brought them back to Jolo, asking for $25 million in ransom money. The Abu Sayyaf has also kidnapped several journalists and photographers in Jolo. The US has already spent millions of dollars for information leading to the arrest of militants; and offered up to $5 million in bounty with Manila as much as P10 million reward for information leading to the capture of Abu Sayyaf leaders.

Sulu governor Benjamin Loong supported the US Special Forces projects “Operation Smiles” of providing medical care, and building roads and schools. The US Special Forces and Governor Loong hopes that winning respect and alleviating poverty from the people will stop terrorist recruitment. Governor Loong claimed that many residents have turned away Abu Sayyaf and Jemaah Islamiah members.

=== War on terror ===
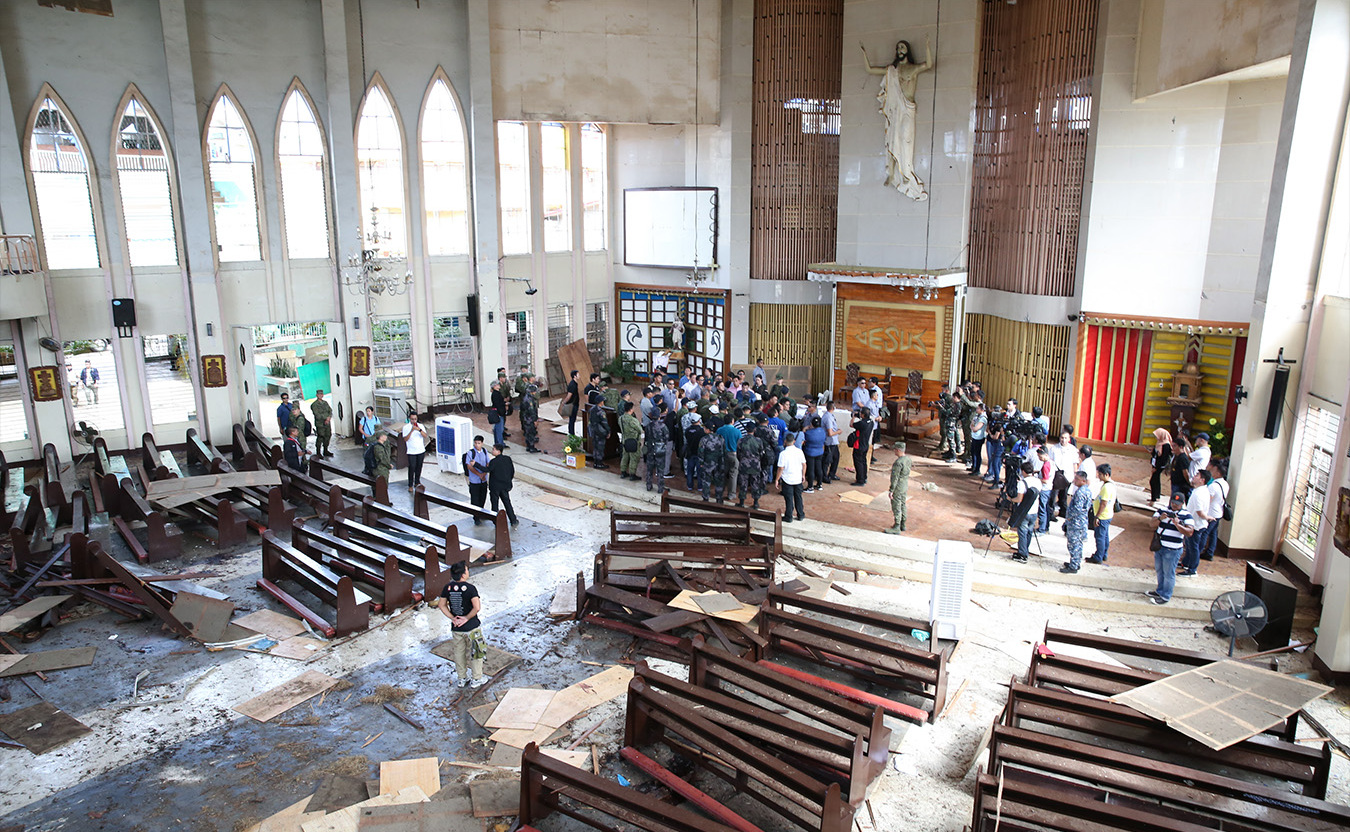
The damage of the cathedral on January 28, 2019.

Three months after the September 11 attacks, George W. Bush announced the US was opening a second front in the war on terror in the Philippines. The Archipelago became the testing grounds for the Philippine anti-terror plan “Clear, Hold and Develop”. In August 2006, Operation Ultimatum was launched and 5,000 Philippine marines and soldiers, supported by the US Special Forces began clearing the island of Jolo, fighting against a force of 400 guerillas. By February 2007, the town of Jolo was deemed cleared of terrorists.

=== 2019 cathedral bombings ===
On 27 January 2019, two bombings took place at the Cathedral of Our Lady of Mount Carmel. The bombings led by an unknown bandit but not exactly group Abu Sayyaf were widely condemned by local people in Jolo. The bombing caused at least few people killed or wounded during that day.

=== 2020 town plaza bombings ===
On 24 August 2020, at around 12:00 pm, a bomb exploded in front of the Paradise Food Plaza in Barangay Walled City. At least five civilians and four soldiers were killed, while several others were wounded. A second bomb exploded at around 1:00 pm near the Cathedral of Our Lady of Mount Carmel, which was the same site of two bombings last year. One civilian was killed while two others were injured. Philippine Red Cross Chief Richard Gordon said that a motorcycle loaded with an improvised explosive device exploded near a military truck.

== Political and societal significance ==
Sulu Provincial Capitol

The Moros are geographically concentrated in the Southwest of the Philippines. Moros identify mostly with the majority Muslim nations of Indonesia and Malaysia because of their geographic proximity, and linguistic and cultural similarities. Moros have faced encroachments from the Spanish, Americans and now face the national Philippine government. Thus, the struggle for the Moro independent state has existed for over 400 years.

Jolo has been the center of this conflict. Between 1972 and 1976, Jolo was the center of the Muslim Separatist Rebellion between the Muslim militants and the Marcos regime which killed 120,000 people. In 1974, fighting broke out when the government troops stopped the Moro National Liberation Front (MNLF) from taking over the town.

Currently, the Moro National Liberation Front is the ruling party of the Autonomous Region in Muslim Mindanao (ARMM). In 1996, the MNLF was granted leadership of the ARMM in response to the calls for Muslim autonomy. Abdusakur Tan is the governor of Sulu and Edsir Tan is the mayor of Jolo. Politicians in these regions rose to power with the help of clan connections.

== See also ==
- Battle of Jolo (1974)
