= Triggering device =

Type of electronic circuit

A Triggering device is an electronic circuit, such as a Schmitt trigger, which is used to control another electronic circuit.

== Uses ==
In many of industrial operations, the delivery of a variable and controlled amount of electrical power is necessary. The most common of these operations include electric lighting, electric motor speed control, electric welding, and electric heating. Although it is always possible to control the amount of electrical power delivered to a load by using a variable transformer to create a variable secondary output voltage, these transformers are physically large and expensive and need frequent maintenance (in high power ratings). There are other methods of controlling power to a load, but they are mostly not available for high power applications.

Since 1961, an alternative method, using thyristors, has been in use. Both silicon-controlled rectifiers (SCR) and TRIACs are members of the thyristor family. The term thyristor includes all the semiconductor devices, which show inherent ON-OFF behavior, as opposed to allowing gradual changes in conduction. All thyristors are regenerative switching devices, and they cannot operate in linear manner. Thus, a transistor is not a thyristor even though it can operate like a switch (ON-OFF). The transistor is not inherently an ON-OFF device, and it is possible for a transistor to operate linearly.

Some thyristors can be gated into the ON state. Other thyristors cannot be gated ON, but they can be turned ON when the applied voltage reaches a certain breakover value.so that is why it has been confirmed that trigger devices are digital electronics devices which change their out put when we applied some trigger on that example change in [voltage]
